= Chiaroscuro =

Use of strong contrasts between light and dark in art

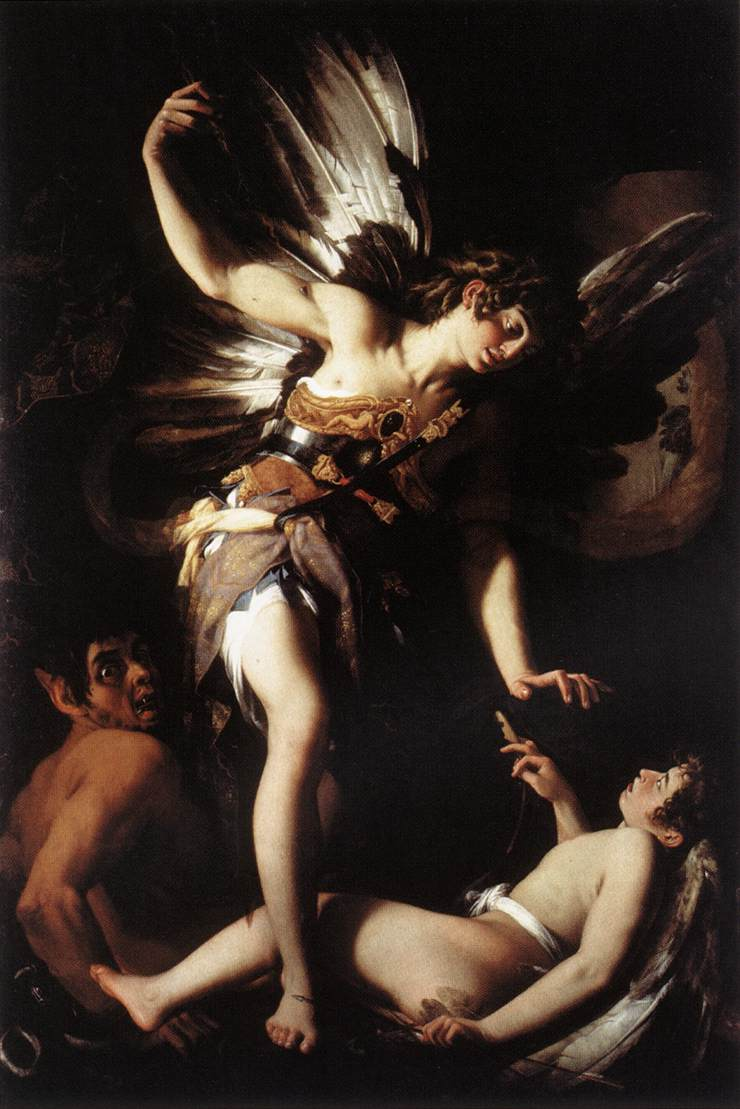
Giovanni Baglione. Divine Love Conquering Earthly Love (1602–1603), showing dramatic compositional chiaroscuro.

In art, chiaroscuro (English: /kiˌɑːrəˈsk(j)ʊəroʊ/ kee-AR-ə-SKOOR-oh, -SKURE-, Italian: [ˌkjaroˈskuːro]; lit. 'light-dark') is the use of strong contrasts between light and dark, usually bold contrasts affecting a whole composition. It is also a technical term used by artists and art historians for the use of contrasts of light to achieve a sense of volume in modelling three-dimensional objects and figures.

Similar effects in cinema, and black and white and low-key photography, are also called chiaroscuro. Taken to its extreme, the use of shadow and contrast to focus strongly on the subject of a painting is called tenebrism. Further specialized uses of the term include chiaroscuro woodcut for colour woodcuts printed with different blocks, each using a different coloured ink; and chiaroscuro for drawings on coloured paper in a dark medium with white highlighting.

Chiaroscuro originated in the Renaissance period but is most notably associated with Baroque art. Chiaroscuro is one of the canonical painting modes of the Renaissance (alongside cangiante, sfumato and unione) (see also Renaissance art). Artists known for using the technique include Leonardo da Vinci, Caravaggio, Rembrandt, Vermeer, Goya, and Georges de La Tour.

== History ==
=== Origin in the chiaroscuro drawing ===
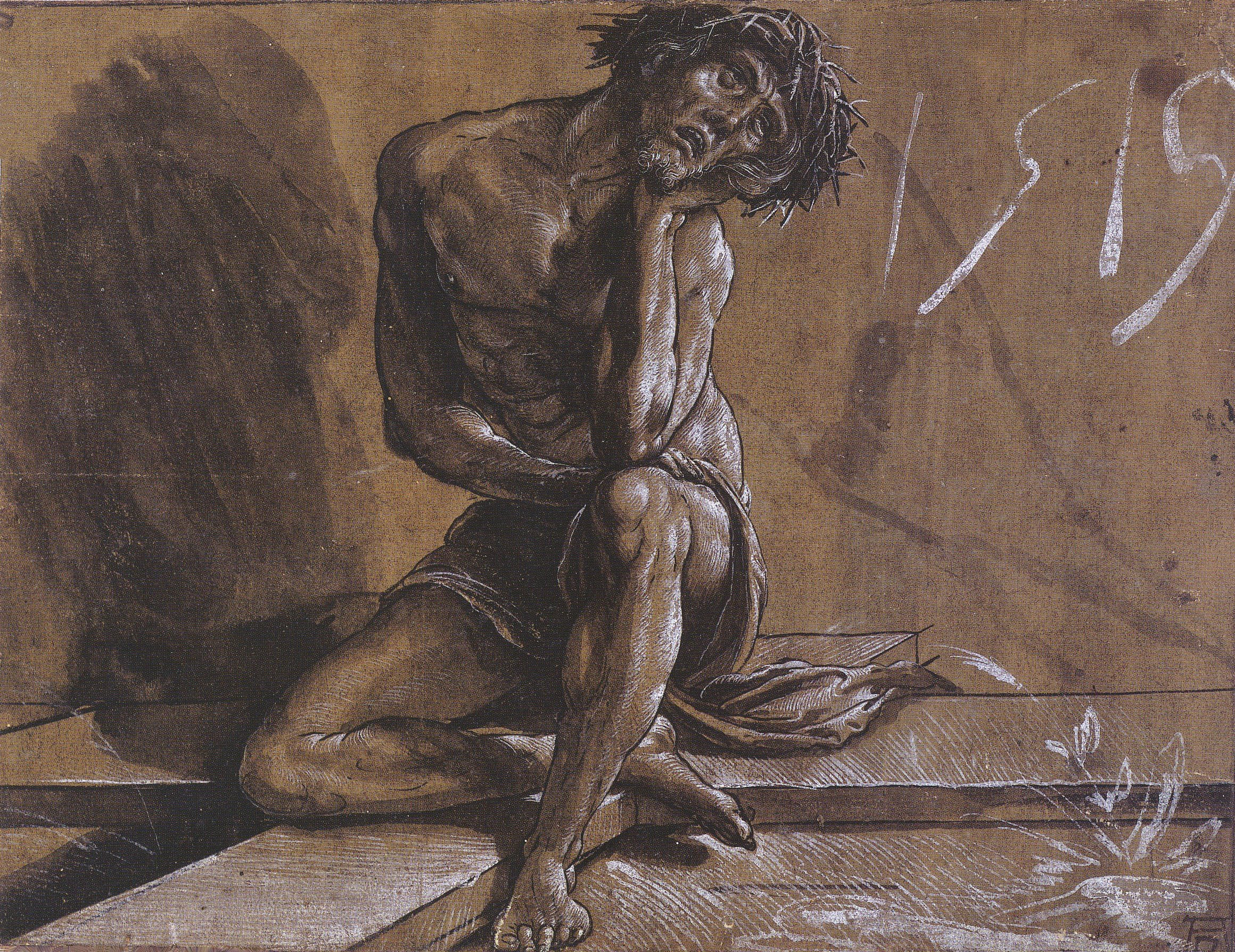
Christ at Rest, by Hans Holbein the Younger, 1519, a chiaroscuro drawing using pen, ink, and brush, washes, white heightening, on ochre prepared paper

The term chiaroscuro originated during the Renaissance as drawing on coloured paper, where the artist worked from the paper's base tone toward light using white gouache, and toward dark using ink, bodycolour or watercolour. These in turn drew on traditions in illuminated manuscripts going back to late Roman Imperial manuscripts on purple-dyed vellum. Such works are called "chiaroscuro drawings", but may only be described in modern museum terminology by such formulae as "pen on prepared paper, heightened with white bodycolour". Chiaroscuro woodcuts began as imitations of this technique. When discussing Italian art, the term sometimes is used to mean painted images in monochrome or two colours, more generally known in English by the French equivalent, grisaille. The term broadened in meaning early on to cover all strong contrasts in illumination between light and dark areas in art, which is now the primary meaning.

=== Chiaroscuro modelling ===
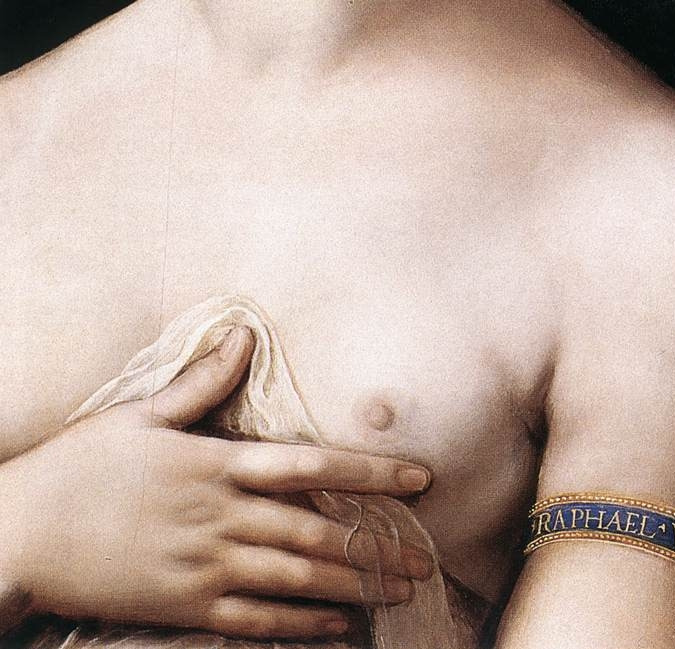
Detail of La Fornarina (1518–19) by Raphael, shows delicate modelling chiaroscuro in the body of the model, for example in the shoulder, breast, and arm on the right

The more technical use of the term chiaroscuro is the effect of light modelling in painting, drawing, or printmaking, where three-dimensional volume is suggested by the value gradation of colour and the analytical division of light and shadow shapes—often called "shading". The invention of these effects in the West, "skiagraphia" or "shadow-painting" to the Ancient Greeks, traditionally was ascribed to the famous Athenian painter of the fifth century BC, Apollodoros. Although few Ancient Greek paintings survive, their understanding of the effect of light modelling still may be seen in the late-fourth-century BC mosaics of Pella, Macedonia, in particular the Stag Hunt Mosaic, in the House of the Abduction of Helen, inscribed gnosis epoesen, or 'knowledge did it'.

The technique also survived in rather crude standardized form in Byzantine art and was refined again in the Middle Ages to become standard by the early fifteenth-century in painting and manuscript illumination in Italy and Flanders, and then spread to all Western art.

According to the theory of the art historian Marcia B. Hall, which has gained considerable acceptance, chiaroscuro is one of four modes of painting colours available to Italian High Renaissance painters, along with cangiante, sfumato and unione.

The Raphael painting illustrated, with light coming from the left, demonstrates both delicate modelling chiaroscuro to give volume to the body of the model, and strong chiaroscuro in the more common sense, in the contrast between the well-lit model and the very dark background of foliage. To further complicate matters, however, the compositional chiaroscuro of the contrast between model and background probably would not be described using this term, as the two elements are almost completely separated. The term is mostly used to describe compositions where at least some principal elements of the main composition show the transition between light and dark, as in the Baglioni and Geertgen tot Sint Jans paintings illustrated above and below.

Chiaroscuro modelling is now taken for granted, but it has had some opponents; namely: the English portrait miniaturist Nicholas Hilliard cautioned in his treatise on painting against all but the minimal use we see in his works, reflecting the views of his patron Queen Elizabeth I of England: "seeing that best to show oneself needeth no shadow of place but rather the open light... Her Majesty... chose her place to sit for that purpose in the open alley of a goodly garden, where no tree was near, nor any shadow at all..."

In drawings and prints, modelling chiaroscuro often is achieved by the use of hatching, or shading by parallel lines. Washes, stipple or dotting effects, and "surface tone" in printmaking are other techniques.

=== Chiaroscuro woodcuts ===
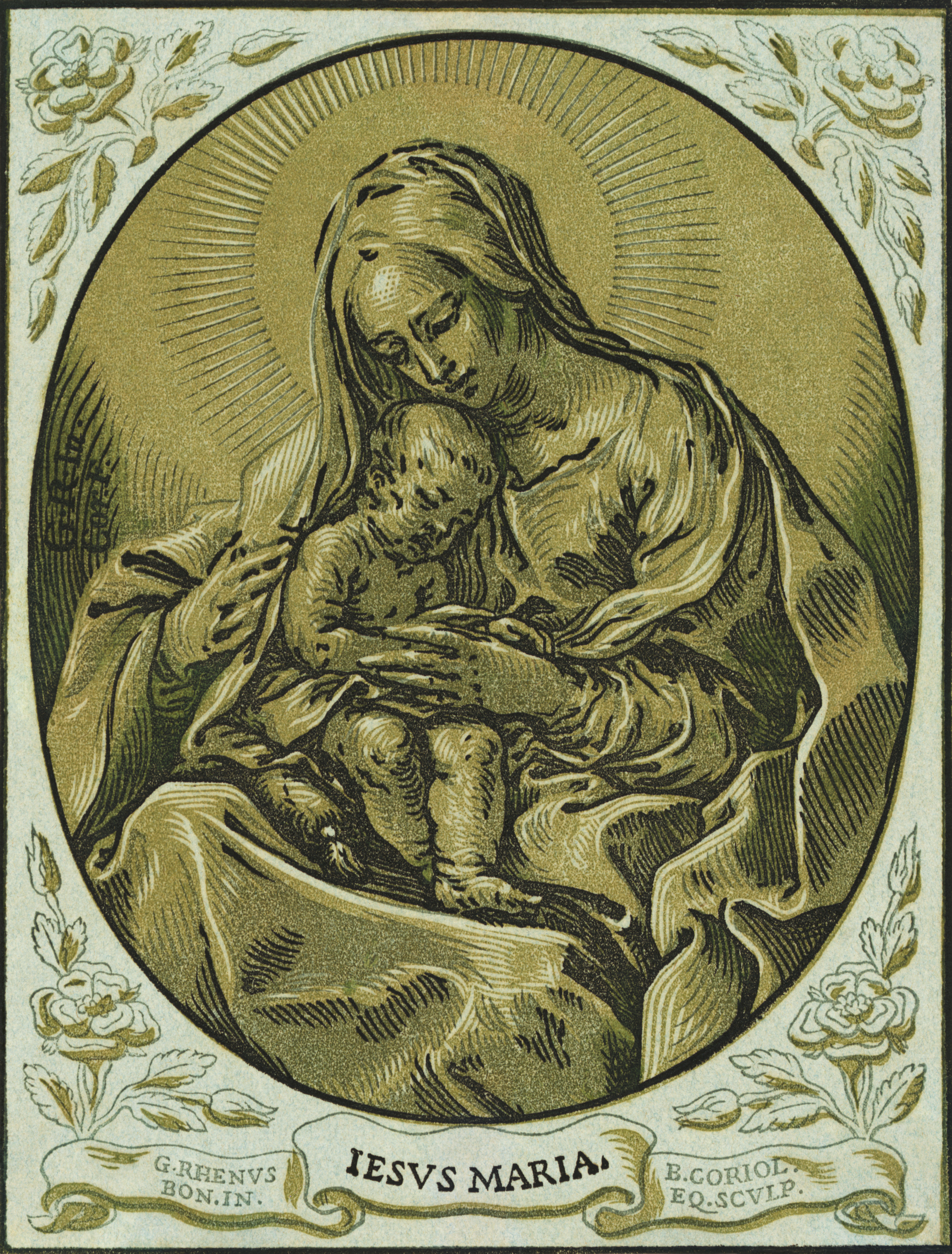
Chiaroscuro woodcut of the Virgin and Child by Bartolommeo Coriolano, created between 1630 and 1655 (digitally restored)

Chiaroscuro woodcuts are old master prints in woodcut using two or more blocks printed in different colours; they do not necessarily feature strong contrasts of light and dark. They were first produced to achieve similar effects to chiaroscuro drawings. After some early experiments in book-printing, the true chiaroscuro woodcut conceived for two blocks was probably first invented by Lucas Cranach the Elder in Germany in 1508 or 1509, though he backdated some of his first prints and added tone blocks to some prints first produced for monochrome printing, swiftly followed by Hans Burgkmair the Elder. The formschneider or block-cutter who worked in the press of Johannes Schott in Strasbourg is claimed to be the first one to achieve chiaroscuro woodcuts with three blocks. Despite Vasari's claim for Italian precedence in Ugo da Carpi, it is clear that his, the first Italian examples, date to around 1516 But other sources suggest, the first chiaroscuro woodcut to be the Triumph of Julius Caesar, which was created by Andrea Mantegna, an Italian painter, between 1470 and 1500. Another view states that: "Lucas Cranach backdated two of his works in an attempt to grab the glory" and that the technique was invented "in all probability" by Burgkmair "who was commissioned by the emperor Maximilian to find a cheap and effective way of getting the imperial image widely disseminated as he needed to drum up money and support for a crusade".

Other printmakers who have used this technique include Hans Wechtlin, Hans Baldung Grien, and Parmigianino. In Germany, the technique achieved its greatest popularity around 1520, but it was used in Italy throughout the sixteenth century. Later artists such as Goltzius sometimes made use of it. In most German two-block prints, the keyblock (or "line block") was printed in black and the tone block or blocks had flat areas of colour. In Italy, chiaroscuro woodcuts were produced without keyblocks to achieve a very different effect.

=== Compositional chiaroscuro to Caravaggio ===
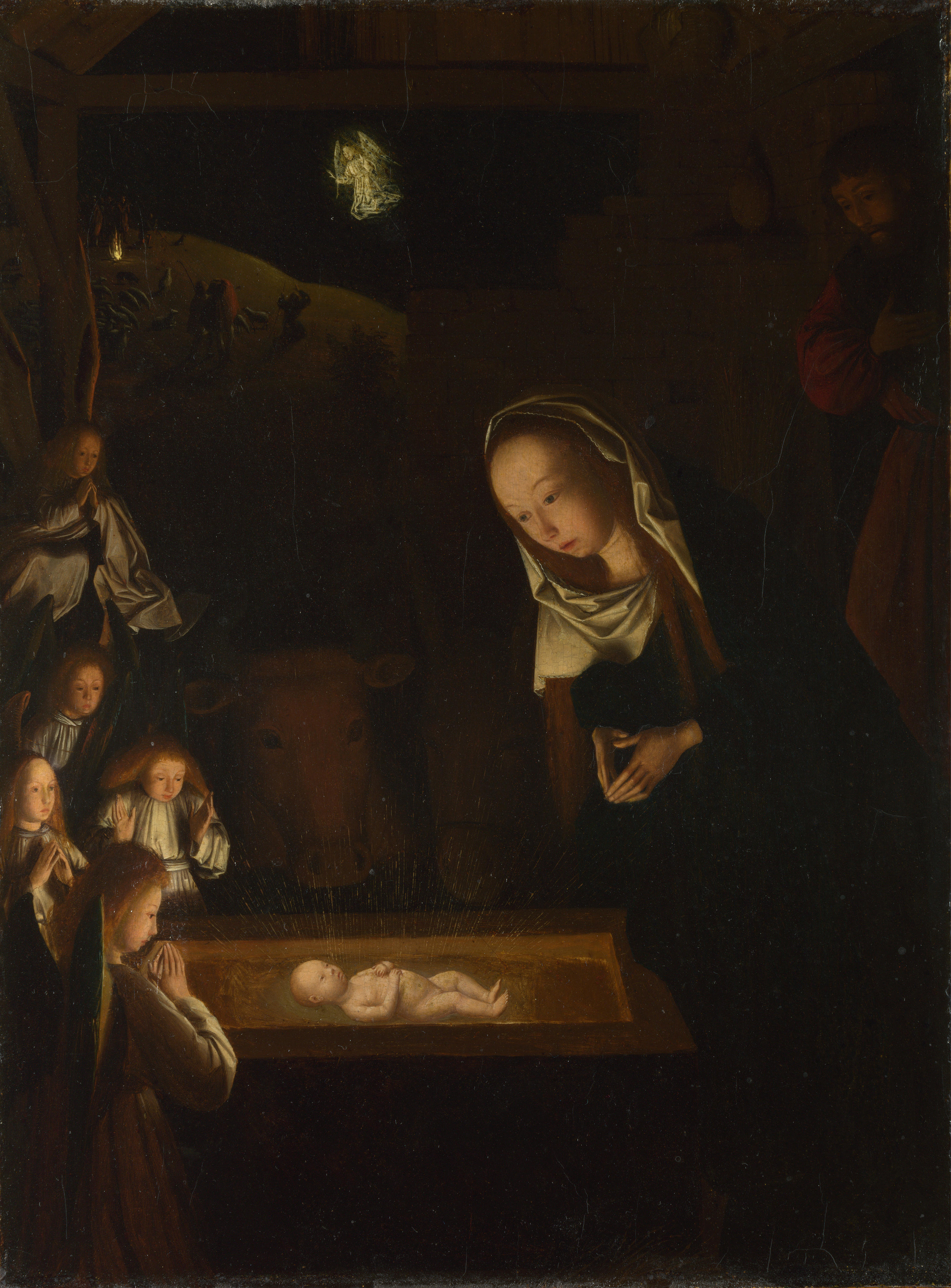
Nativity at Night by Geertgen tot Sint Jans, c. 1490, after a composition by Hugo van der Goes of c. 1470; sources of light are the infant Jesus, the shepherds' fire on the hill behind, and the angel who appears to them.

Manuscript illumination was, as in many areas, especially experimental in attempting ambitious lighting effects since the results were not for public display. The development of compositional chiaroscuro received a considerable impetus in northern Europe from the vision of the Nativity of Jesus of Saint Bridget of Sweden, a very popular mystic. She described the infant Jesus as emitting light; depictions increasingly reduced other light sources in the scene to emphasize this effect, and the Nativity remained very commonly treated with chiaroscuro through to the Baroque. Hugo van der Goes and his followers painted many scenes lit only by candle or the divine light from the infant Christ. As with some later painters, in their hands the effect was of stillness and calm rather than the drama with which it would be used during the Baroque.

Strong chiaroscuro became a popular effect during the sixteenth century in Mannerism and Baroque art. Divine light continued to illuminate, often rather inadequately, the compositions of Tintoretto, Veronese, and their many followers. The use of dark subjects dramatically lit by a shaft of light from a single constricted and often unseen source, was a compositional device developed by Ugo da Carpi (c. 1455 – c. 1523), Giovanni Baglione (1566–1643), and Caravaggio (1571–1610), the last of whom was crucial in developing the style of tenebrism, where dramatic chiaroscuro becomes a dominant stylistic device.

=== 17th and 18th centuries ===
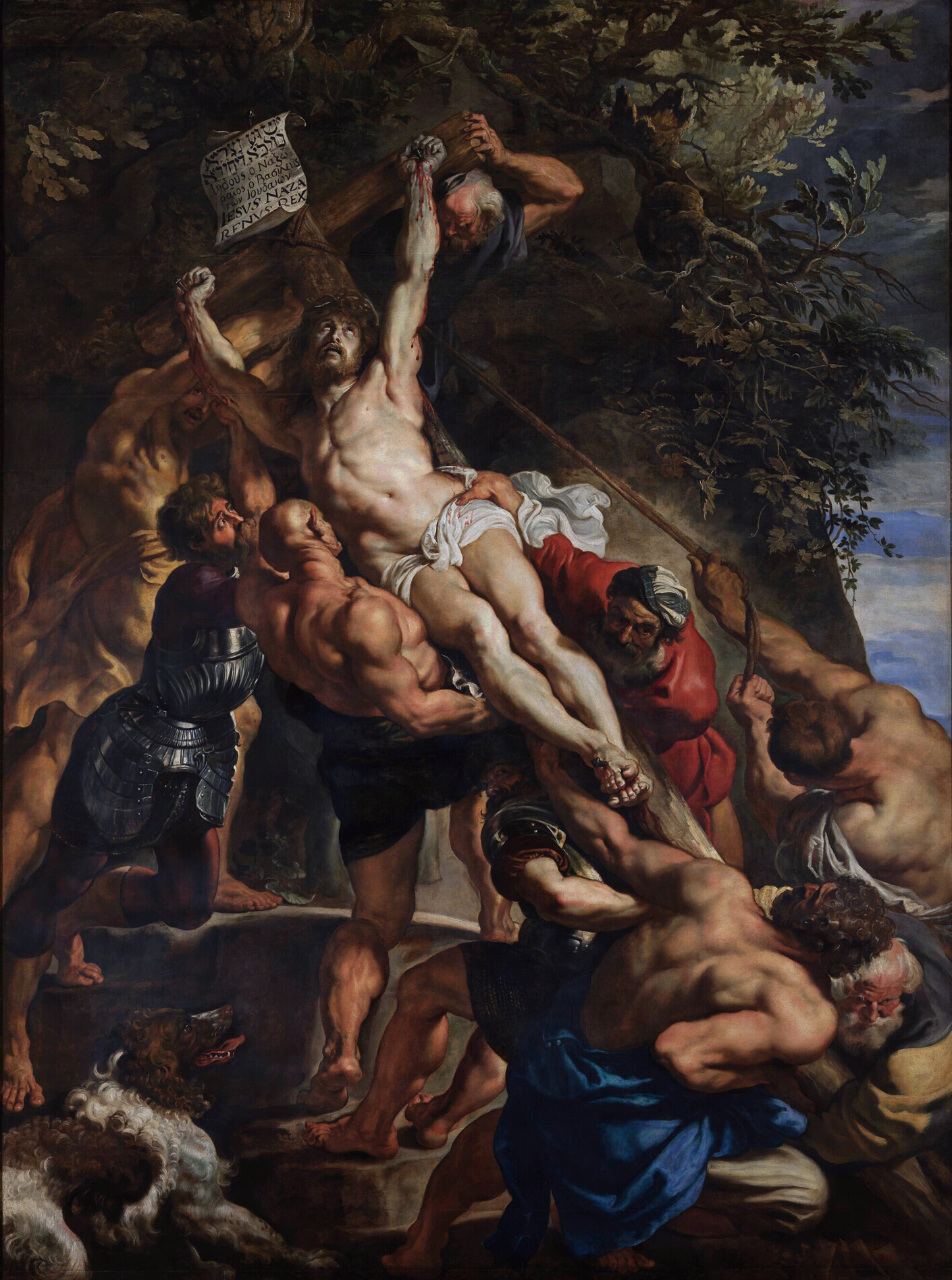
Peter Paul Rubens's The Elevation of the Cross (1610–1611) is modelled with dynamic chiaroscuro.

Tenebrism was especially practiced in Spain and the Spanish-ruled Kingdom of Naples, by Jusepe de Ribera and his followers. Adam Elsheimer (1578–1610), a German artist living in Rome, produced several night scenes lit mainly by fire, and sometimes moonlight. Unlike Caravaggio's, his dark areas contain very subtle detail and interest. The influences of Caravaggio and Elsheimer were strong on Peter Paul Rubens, who exploited their respective approaches to tenebrosity for dramatic effect in paintings such as The Raising of the Cross (1610–1611). Artemisia Gentileschi (1593–1656), a Baroque artist who was a follower of Caravaggio, was also an outstanding exponent of tenebrism and chiaroscuro.

A particular genre that developed was the nocturnal scene lit by candlelight, which looked back to earlier northern artists such as Geertgen tot Sint Jans and more immediately, to the innovations of Caravaggio and Elsheimer. This theme played out with many artists from the Low Countries in the first few decades of the seventeenth century, where it became associated with the Utrecht Caravaggisti such as Gerrit van Honthorst and Dirck van Baburen, and with Flemish Baroque painters such as Jacob Jordaens. Rembrandt van Rijn's (1606–1669) early works from the 1620s also adopted the single-candle light source. The nocturnal candle-lit scene re-emerged in the Dutch Republic in the mid-seventeenth century on a smaller scale in the works of fijnschilders such as Gerrit Dou and Gottfried Schalken.

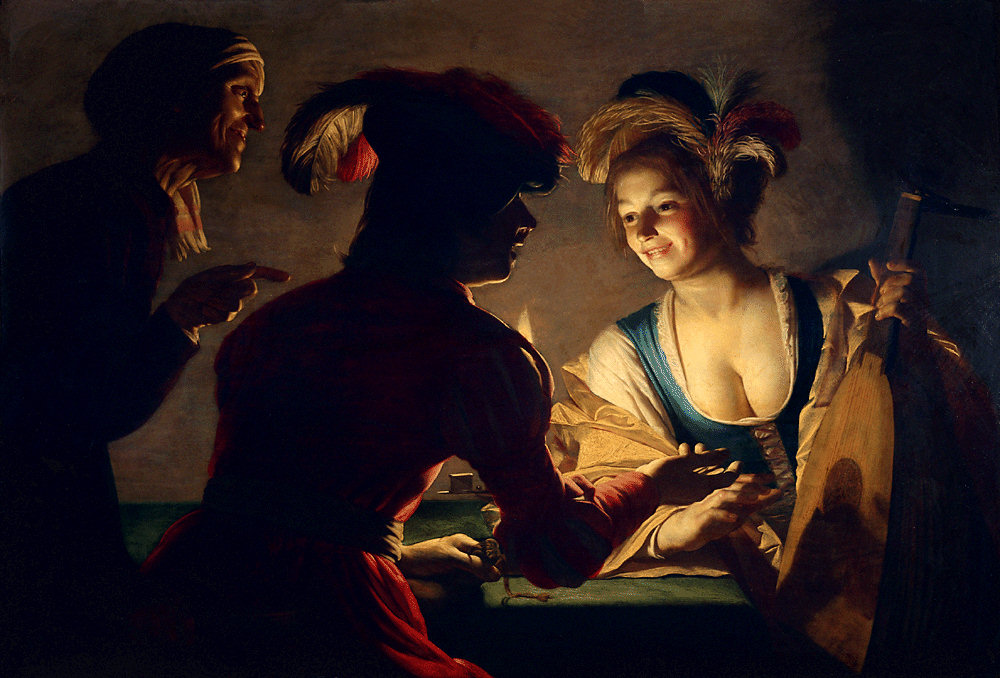
The Matchmaker by Gerrit van Honthorst, 1625

Rembrandt's own interest in effects of darkness shifted in his mature works. He relied less on the sharp contrasts of light and dark that marked the Italian influences of the earlier generation, a factor found in his mid-seventeenth-century etchings. In that medium he shared many similarities with his contemporary in Italy, Giovanni Benedetto Castiglione, whose work in printmaking led him to invent the monotype.

Outside the Low Countries, artists such as Georges de La Tour and Trophime Bigot in France and Joseph Wright of Derby in England, carried on with such strong, but graduated, candlelight chiaroscuro. Watteau used a gentle chiaroscuro in the leafy backgrounds of his fêtes galantes, and this was continued in paintings by many French artists, notably Fragonard. At the end of the century Fuseli and others used a heavier chiaroscuro for romantic effect, as did Delacroix and others in the nineteenth century.

== Use of the term ==
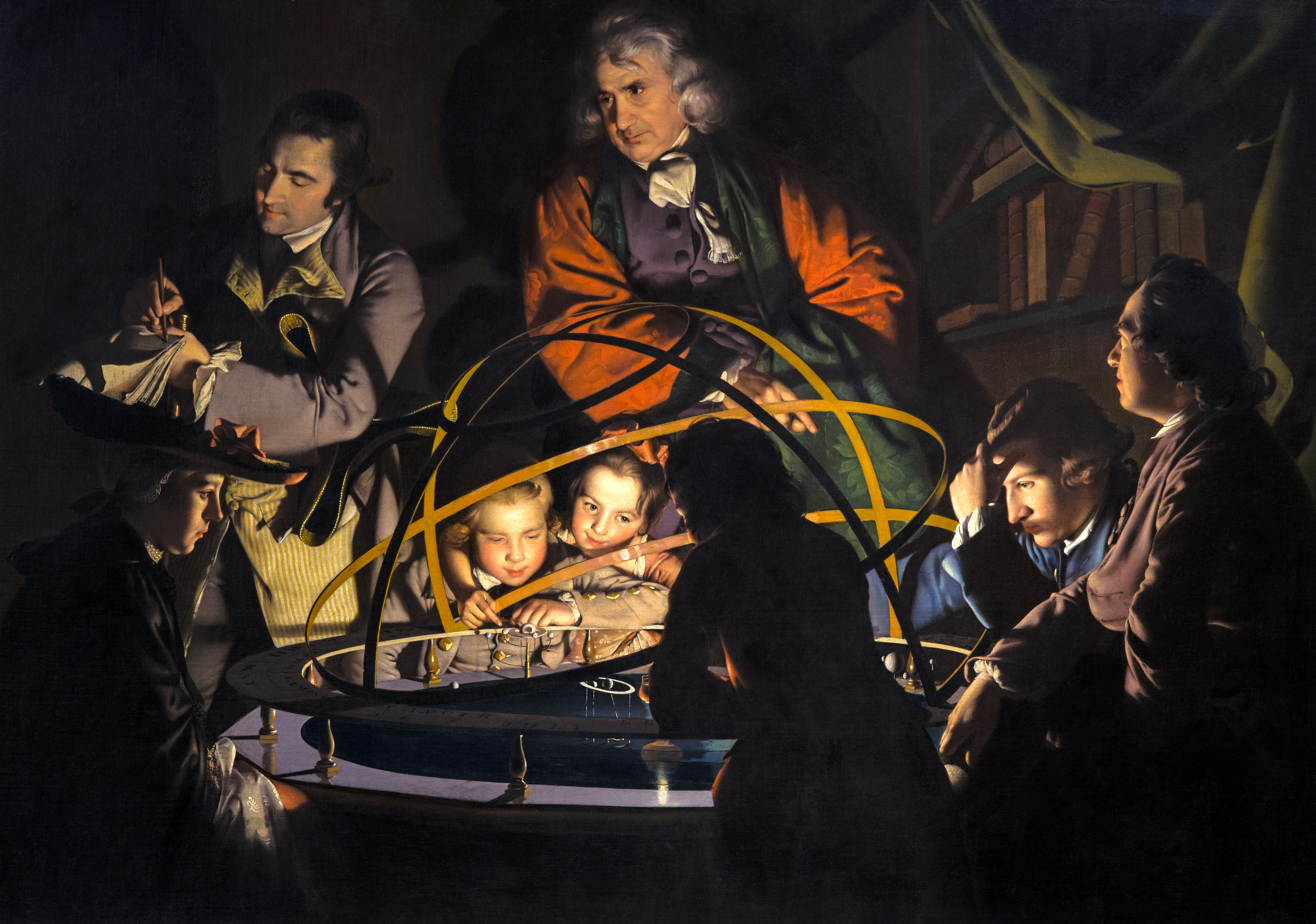
Joseph Wright of Derby painted several large groups with strong chiaroscuro, such as A Philosopher Lecturing on the Orrery, 1766.

The French use of the term, clair-obscur, was introduced by the seventeenth-century art-critic Roger de Piles in the course of a famous argument (Débat sur le coloris), on the relative merits of drawing and colour in painting (his Dialogues sur le coloris, 1673, was a key contribution to the Débat).

In English, the Italian term has been used—originally as claro-obscuro and chiaro-scuro—since at least the late seventeenth century. The term is less frequently used of art after the late nineteenth century, although the Expressionist and other modern movements make great use of the effect.

Especially since the strong twentieth-century rise in the reputation of Caravaggio, in non-specialist use the term is mainly used for strong chiaroscuro effects such as his, or Rembrandt's. As the Tate puts it: "Chiaroscuro is generally only remarked upon when it is a particularly prominent feature of the work, usually when the artist is using extreme contrasts of light and shade".

== Cinema and photography ==
Chiaroscuro is used in cinematography for extreme low key and high-contrast lighting to create distinct areas of light and darkness in films, especially in black and white films. Classic examples are The Cabinet of Dr. Caligari (1920), Nosferatu (1922), Metropolis (1927) The Hunchback of Notre Dame (1939), The Devil and Daniel Webster (1941), and the black and white scenes in Andrei Tarkovsky's Stalker (1979).

For example, in Metropolis, chiaroscuro lighting creates contrast between light and dark mise-en-scene and figures. The effect highlights the differences between the capitalist elite and the workers.

In photography, chiaroscuro can be achieved by using "Rembrandt lighting". In more highly developed photographic processes, the technique may be termed "ambient/natural lighting", although when done so for the effect, the look is artificial and not generally documentary in nature. In particular, Bill Henson along with others, such as W. Eugene Smith, Josef Koudelka, Lothar Wolleh, Annie Leibovitz, Floria Sigismondi, and Ralph Gibson may be considered some of the modern masters of chiaroscuro in documentary photography.

Still from Stanley Kubrick's 1975 film Barry Lyndon, some of which was shot using only candlelight

Perhaps the most direct use of chiaroscuro in filmmaking is Stanley Kubrick's 1975 film Barry Lyndon. When informed that no lens then had a sufficiently wide aperture to shoot a costume drama set in grand palaces using only candlelight, Kubrick bought and retrofitted a special lens for the purpose: a modified Mitchell BNC camera and a Zeiss lens manufactured for the rigors of space photography, with a maximum aperture of f/0.7. The natural, unaugmented lighting of the sets in the film exemplified low-key, natural lighting in filmwork at its most extreme, outside of the Eastern European/Soviet filmmaking tradition (itself exemplified by the harsh low-key lighting style employed by Soviet filmmaker Sergei Eisenstein).

Sven Nykvist, the longtime collaborator of Ingmar Bergman, also informed much of his photography with chiaroscuro realism, as did Gregg Toland, who influenced such cinematographers as László Kovács, Vilmos Zsigmond, and Vittorio Storaro with his use of deep and selective focus augmented with strong horizon-level key lighting penetrating through windows and doorways. Much of the celebrated film noir tradition relies on techniques related to chiaroscuro that Toland perfected in the early 1930s (though high-key lighting, stage lighting, frontal lighting, and other film noir effects are interspersed in ways that diminish the chiaroscuro claim).

== Gallery ==
Chiaroscuro in modelling; paintings

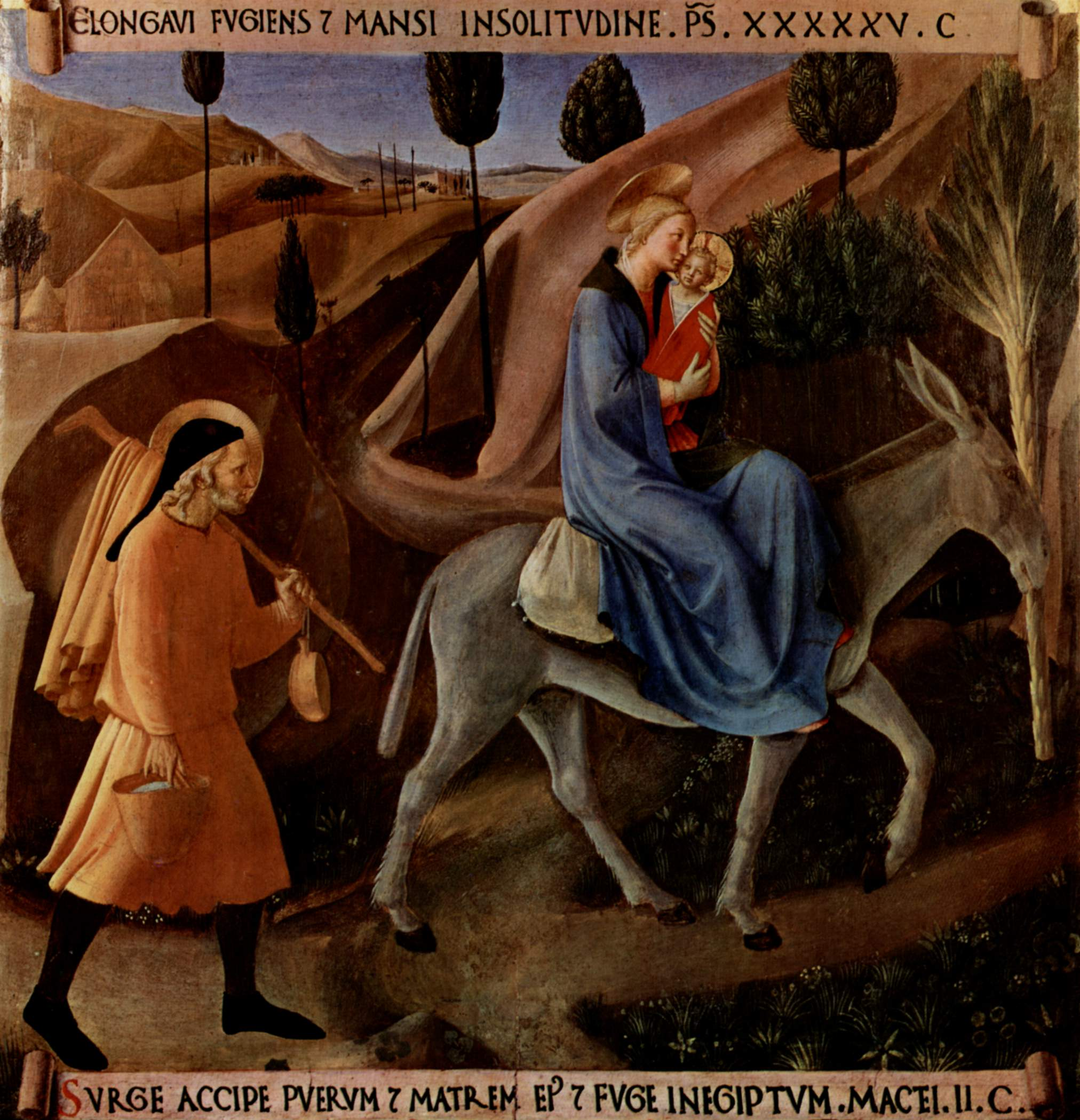
Fra Angelico, c. 1450, uses chiaroscuro modelling in all elements of the painting.

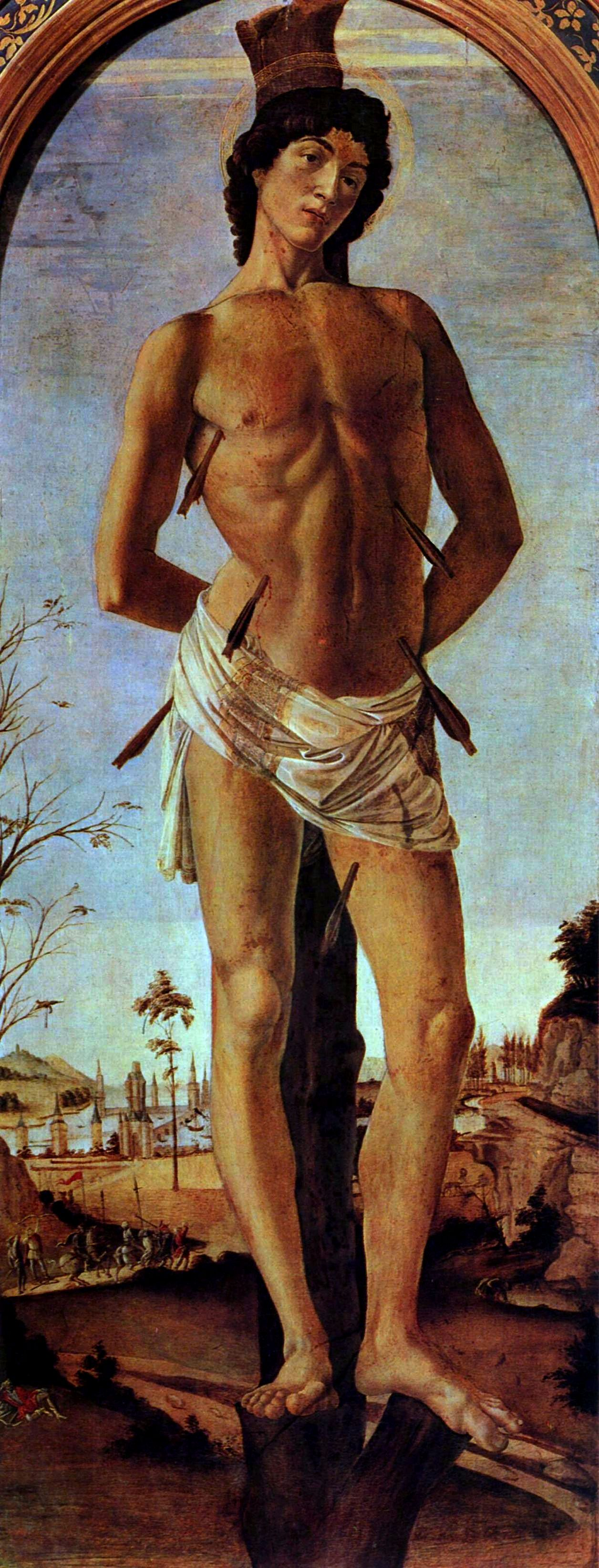
Saint Sebastian by Botticelli, 1474

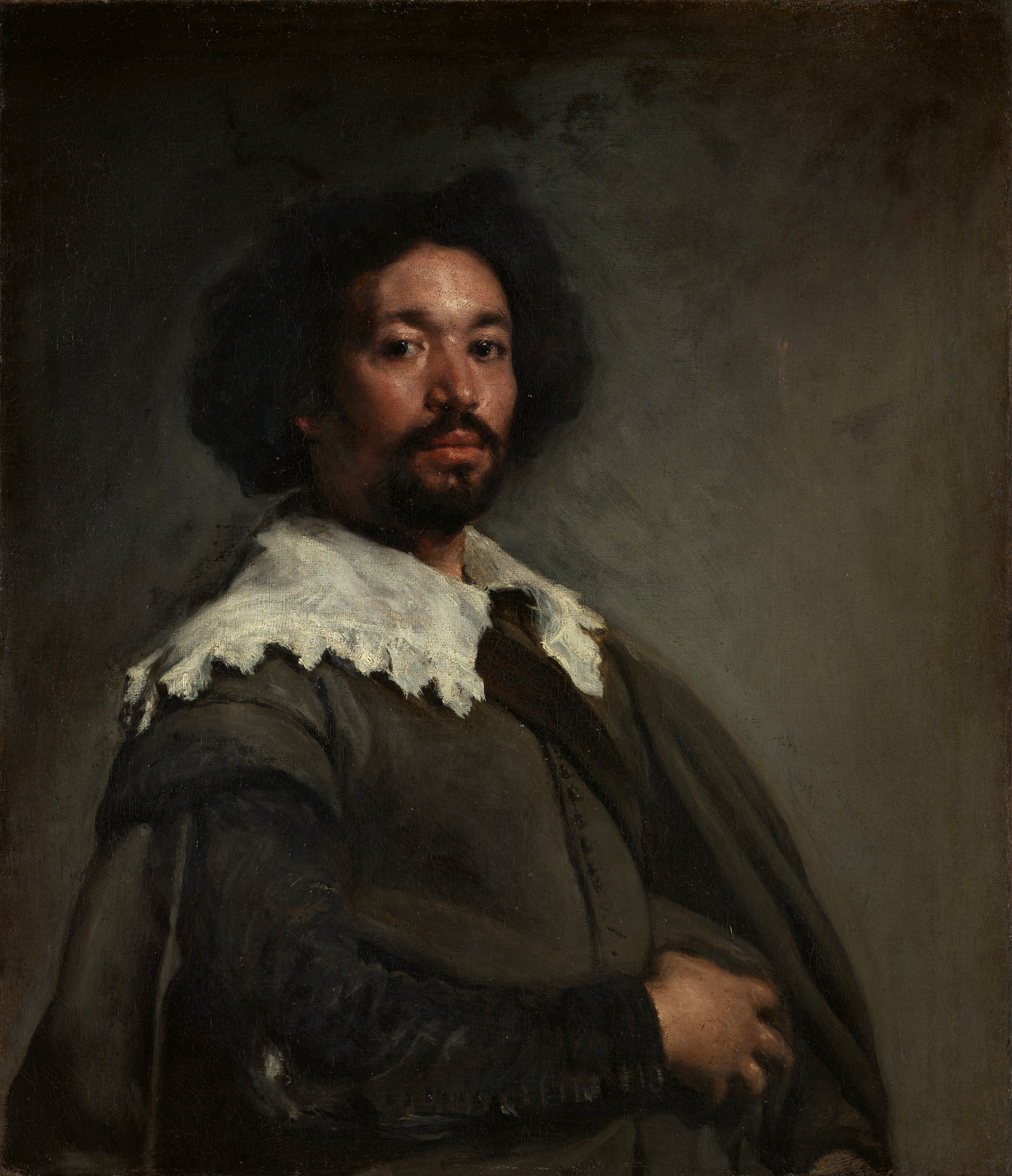
Portrait of Juan de Pareja, c. 1650 by Diego Velázquez, uses subtle highlights and shading on the face and clothes.

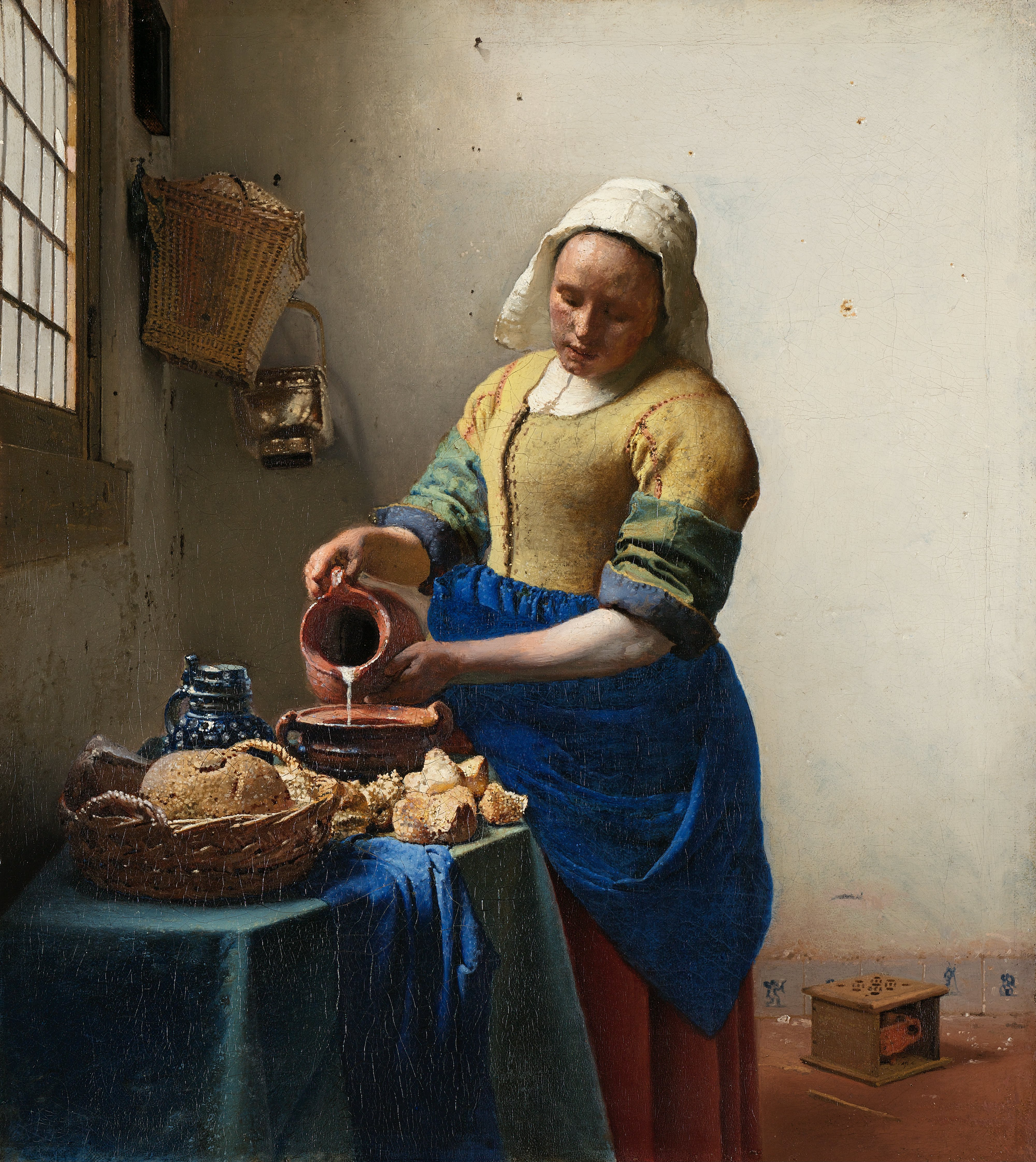
The Milkmaid c. 1658, by Johannes Vermeer, whose use of light to model throughout his compositions is exceptionally complex and delicate

Chiaroscuro in modelling; prints and drawings

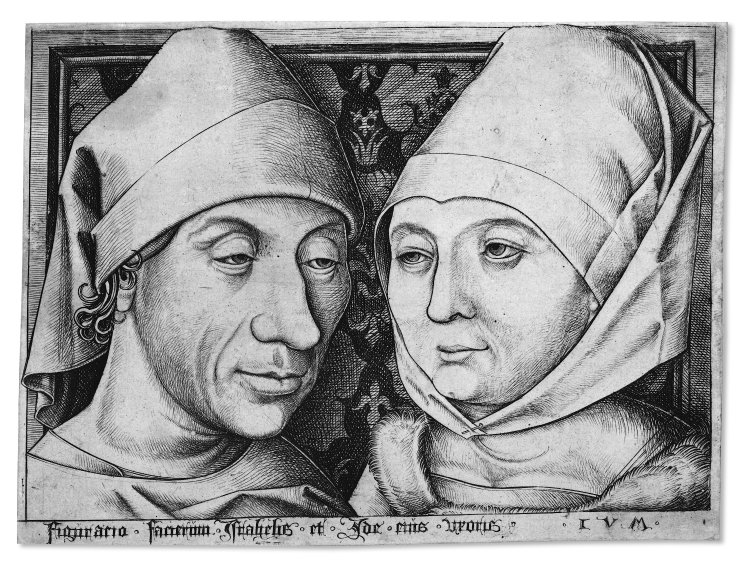
Delicate engraved lines of hatching and cross-hatching, not all distinguishable in reproduction, are used to model the faces and clothes in this late-fifteenth-century engraving.

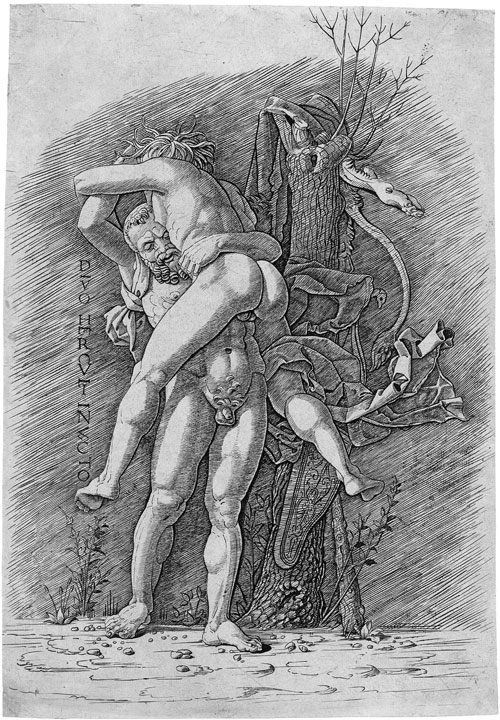
Another fifteenth-century engraving showing highlights and shading, all in lines in the original, used to depict volume

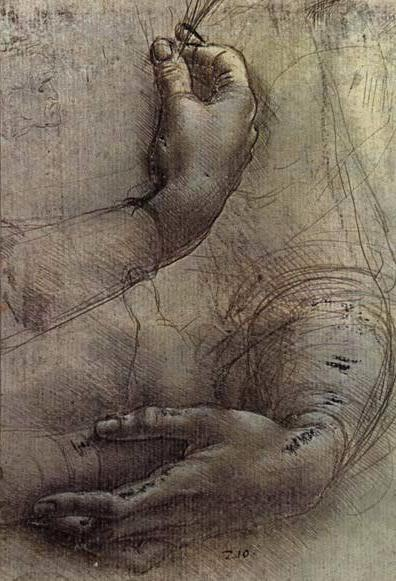
Drawing by Leonardo da Vinci

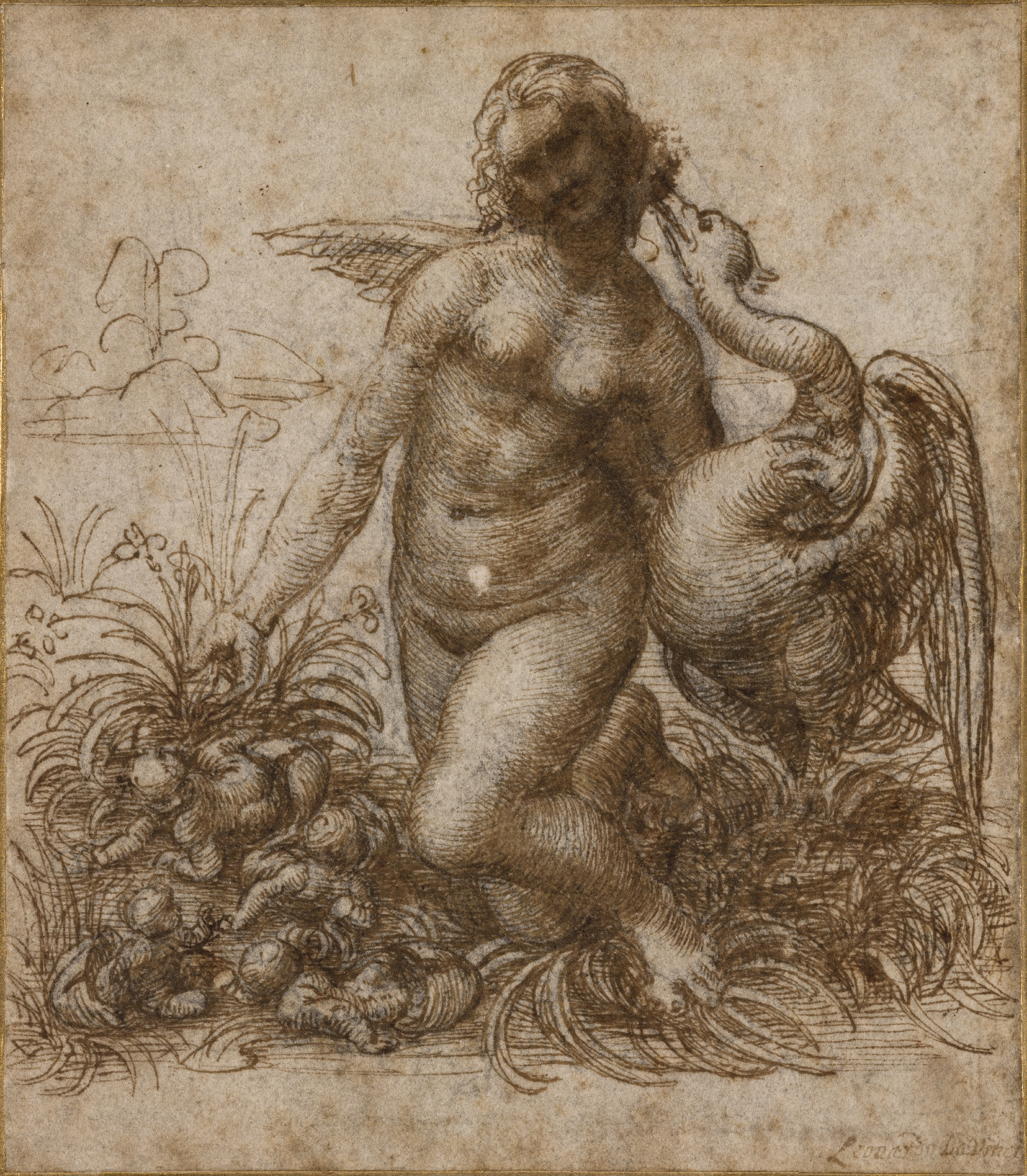
Another study by Leonardo, where the linear make-up of the shading is easily seen in reproduction

Chiaroscuro as an element in composition: painting

Annunciation by Domenico Beccafumi, 1545–46

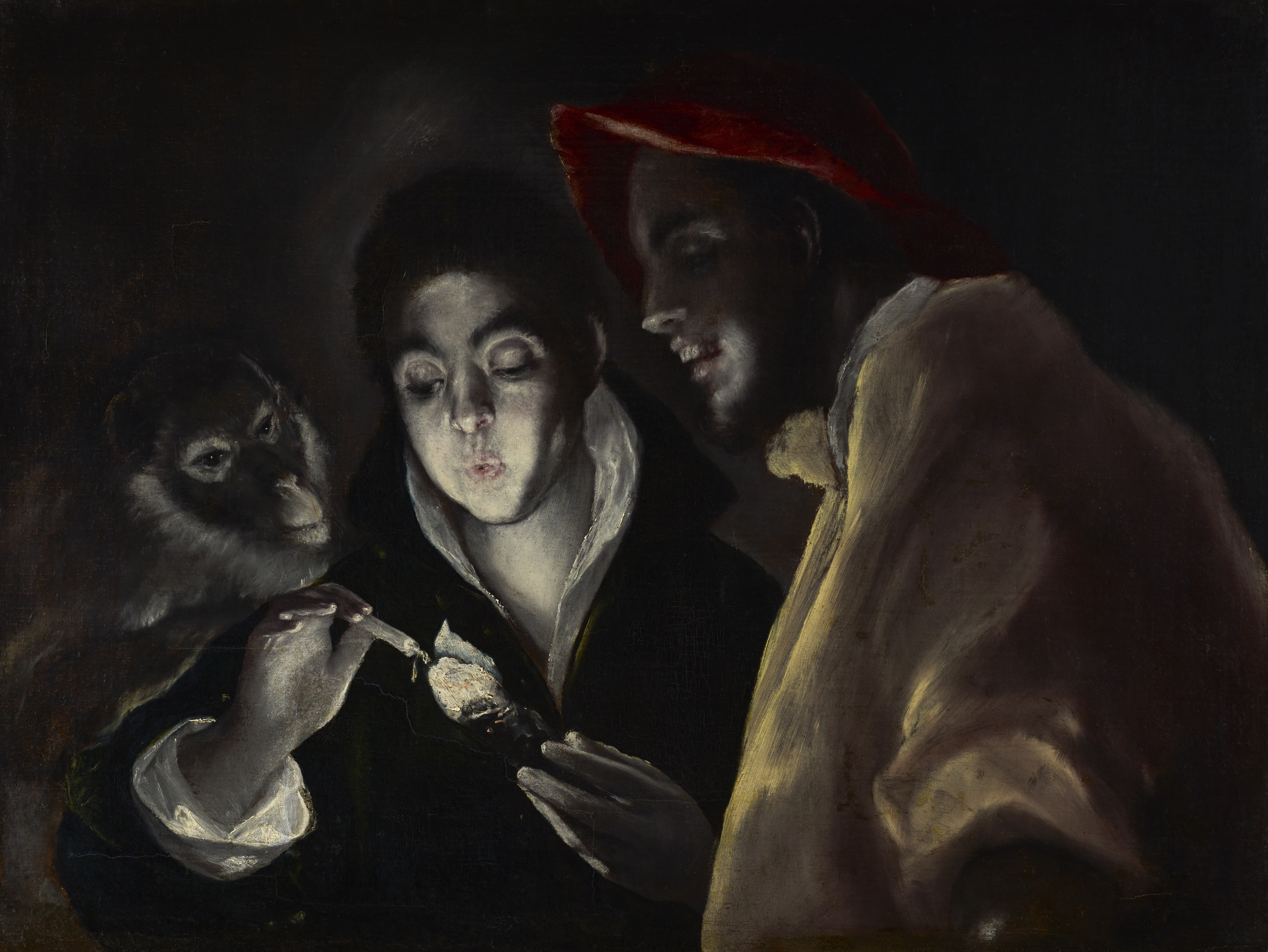
Allegory, Boy Lighting Candle in Company of Ape and Fool by El Greco, 1589–1592

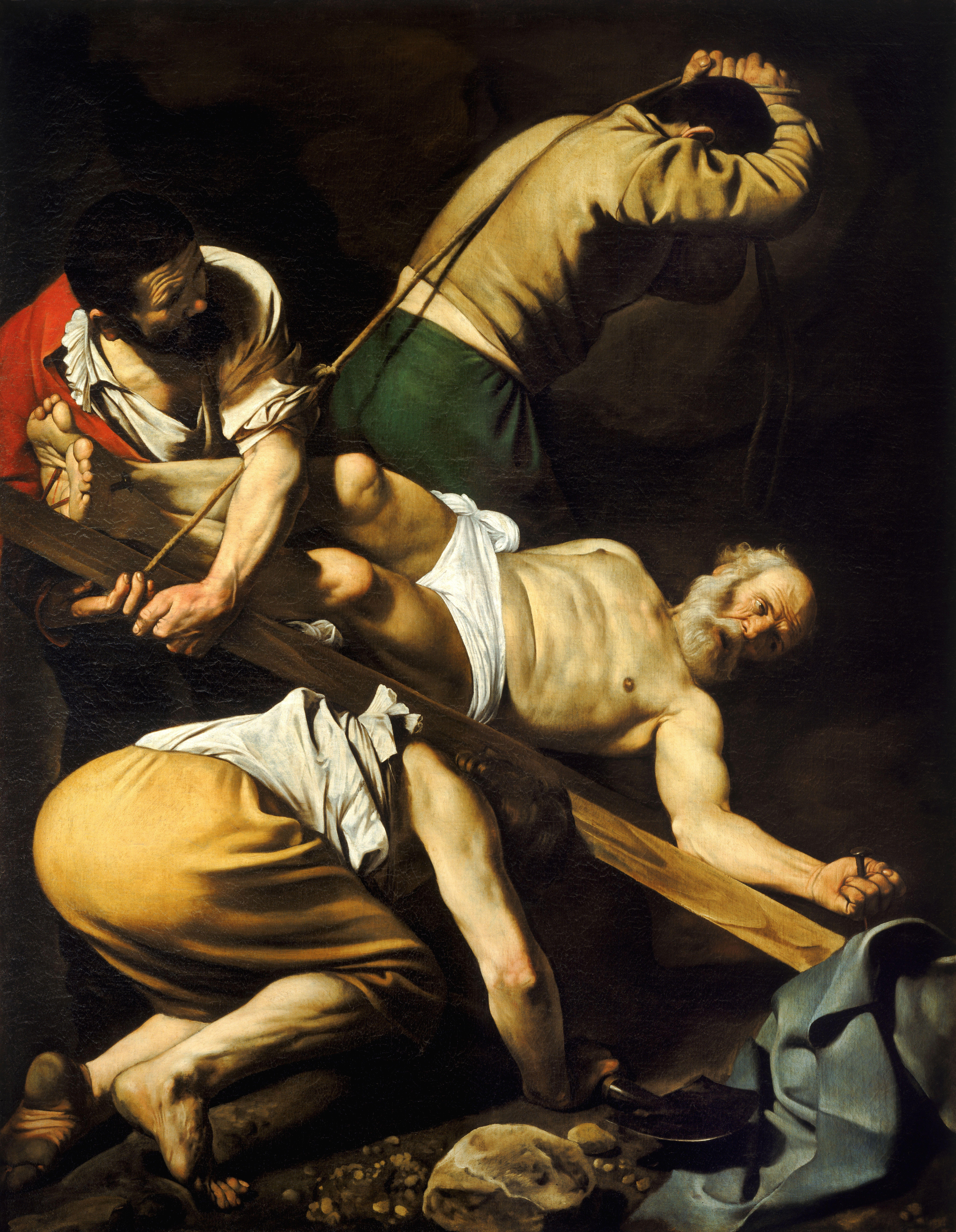
Crucifixion of St. Peter by Caravaggio, 1600

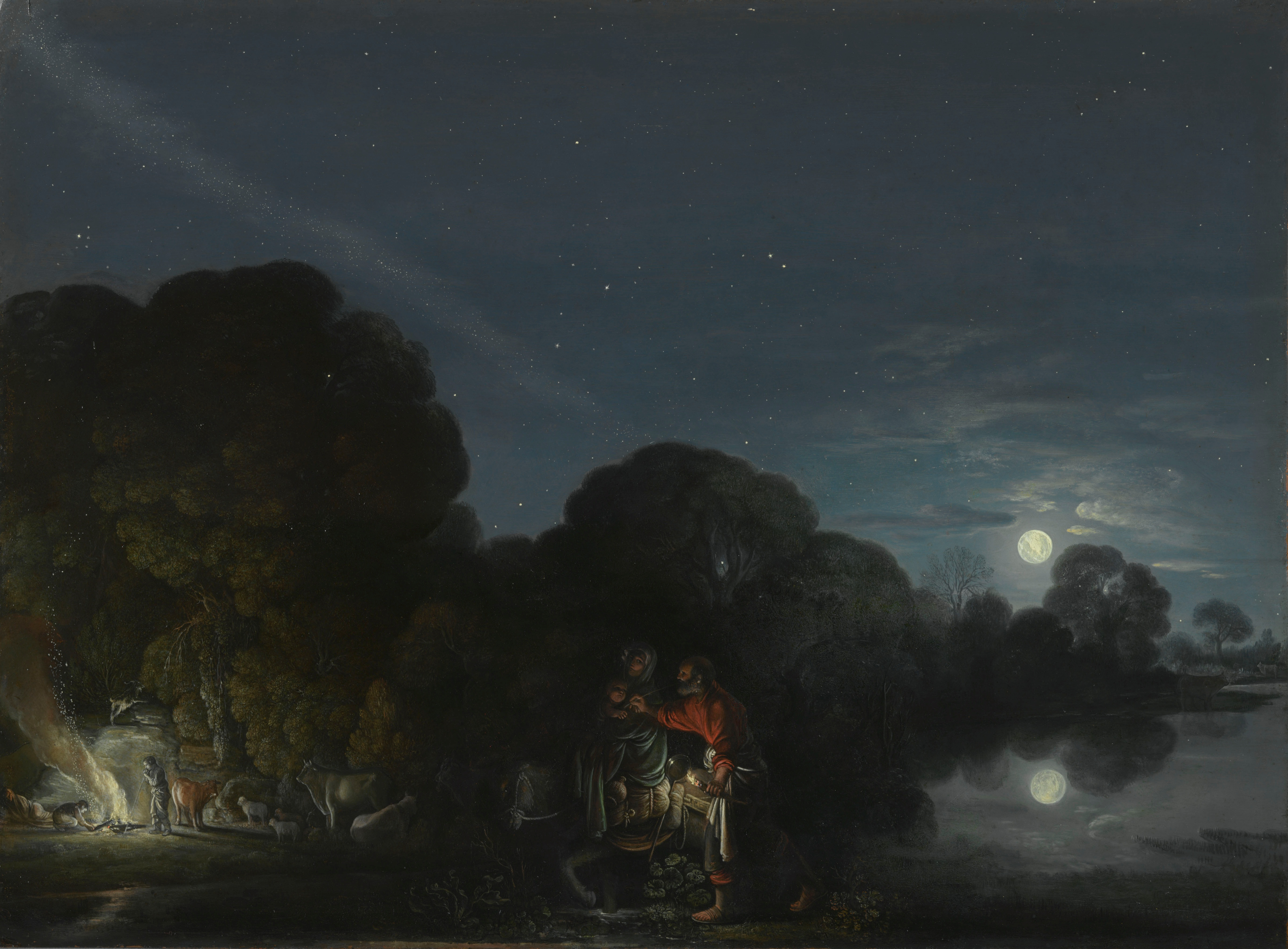
The Flight to Egypt by Adam Elsheimer, 1609

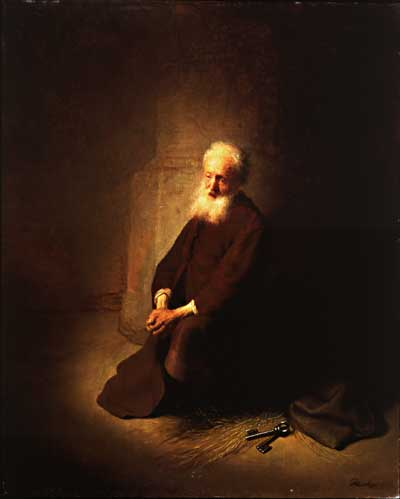
St. Peter in prison by Rembrandt, 1631

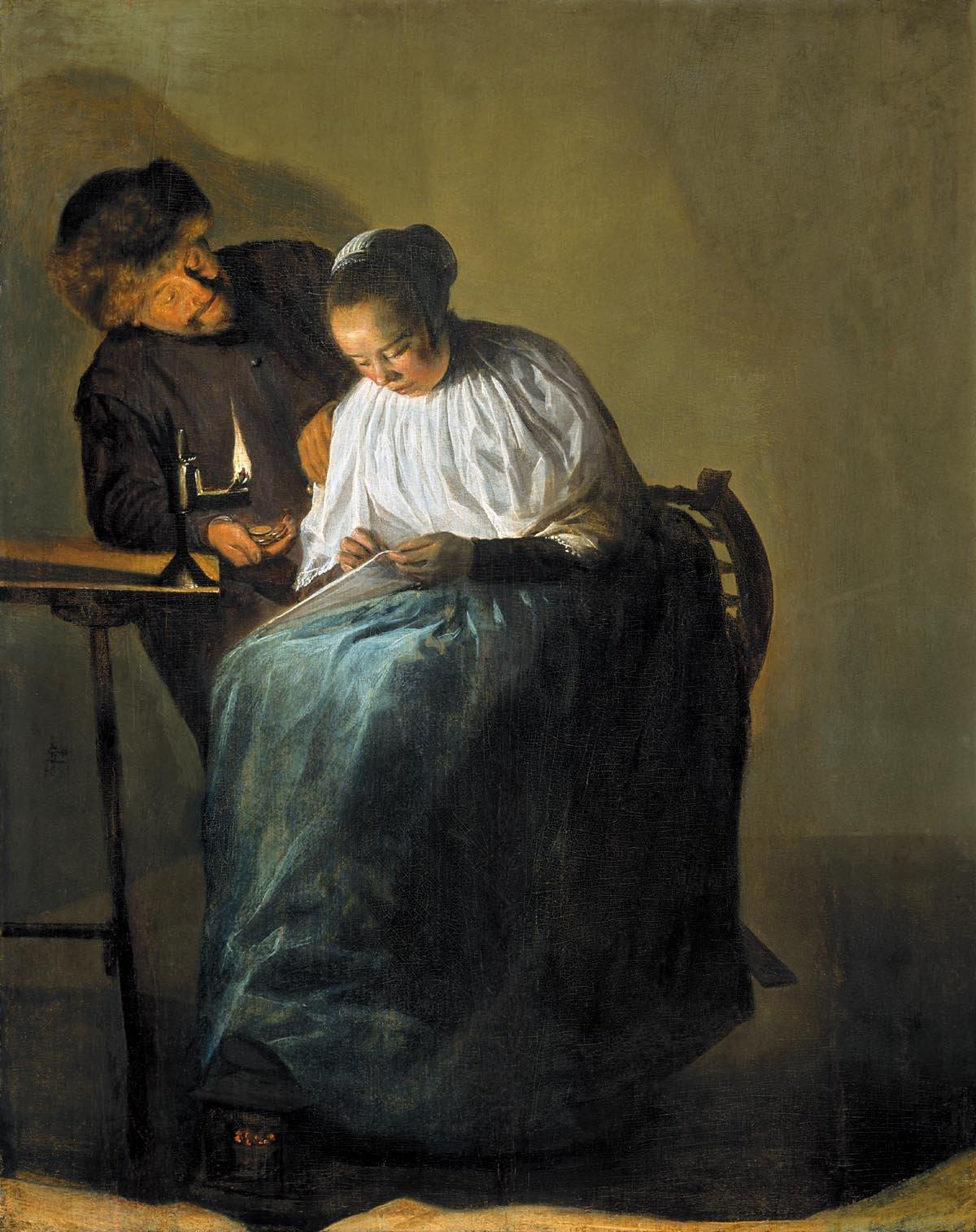
The Proposition by Judith Leyster, 1631

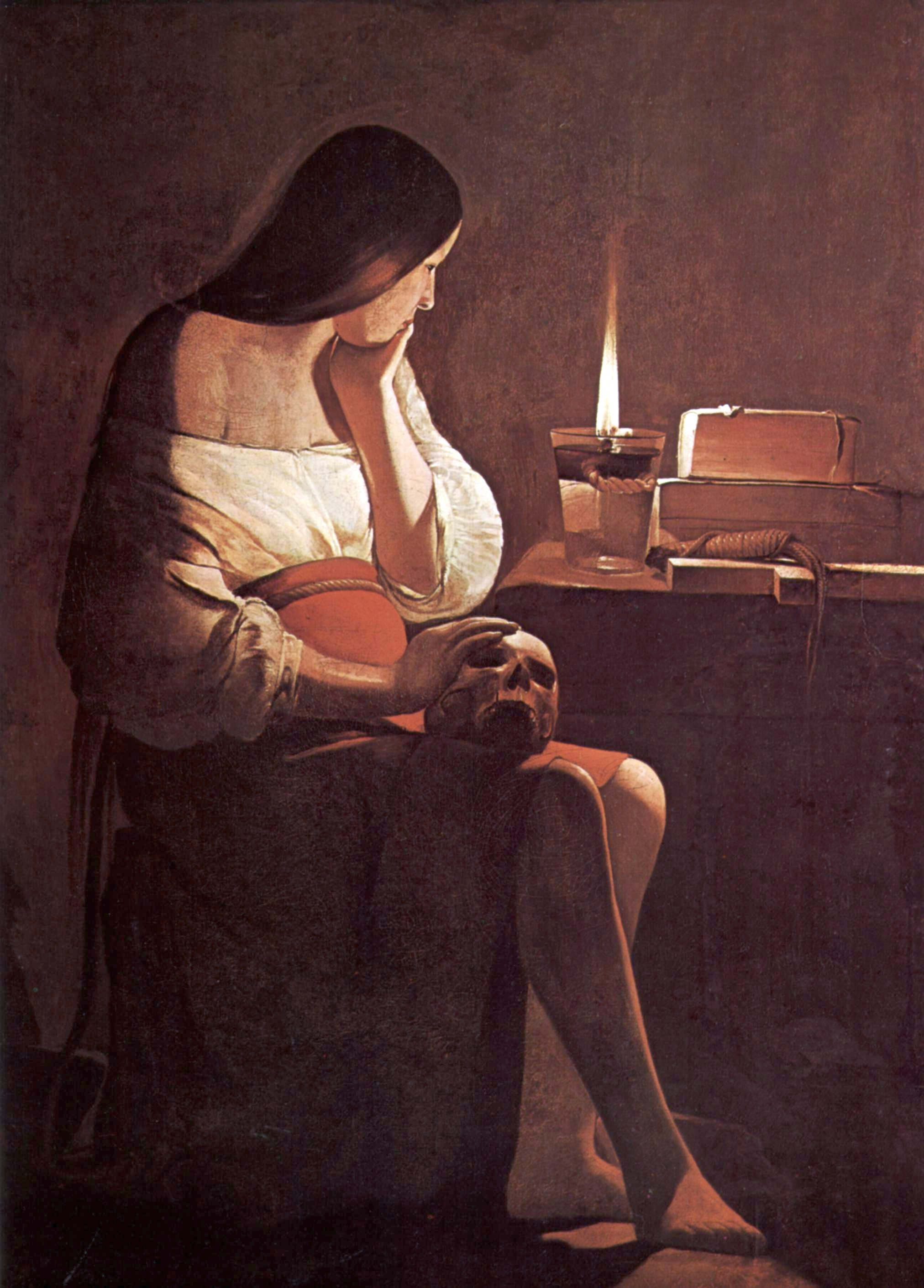
Magdalene with the Smoking Flame, by Georges de La Tour, c. 1640

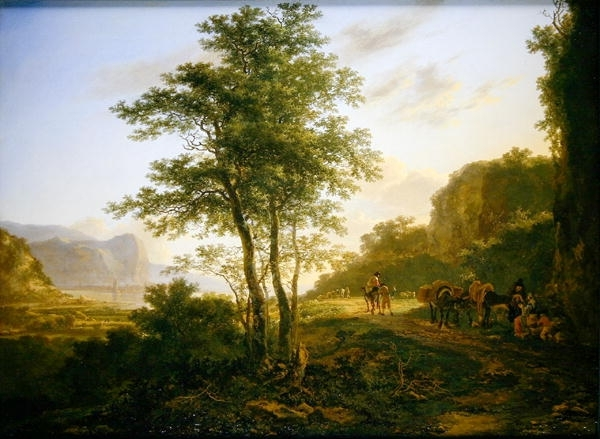
Landscape chiaroscuro, Jan Both, 1646

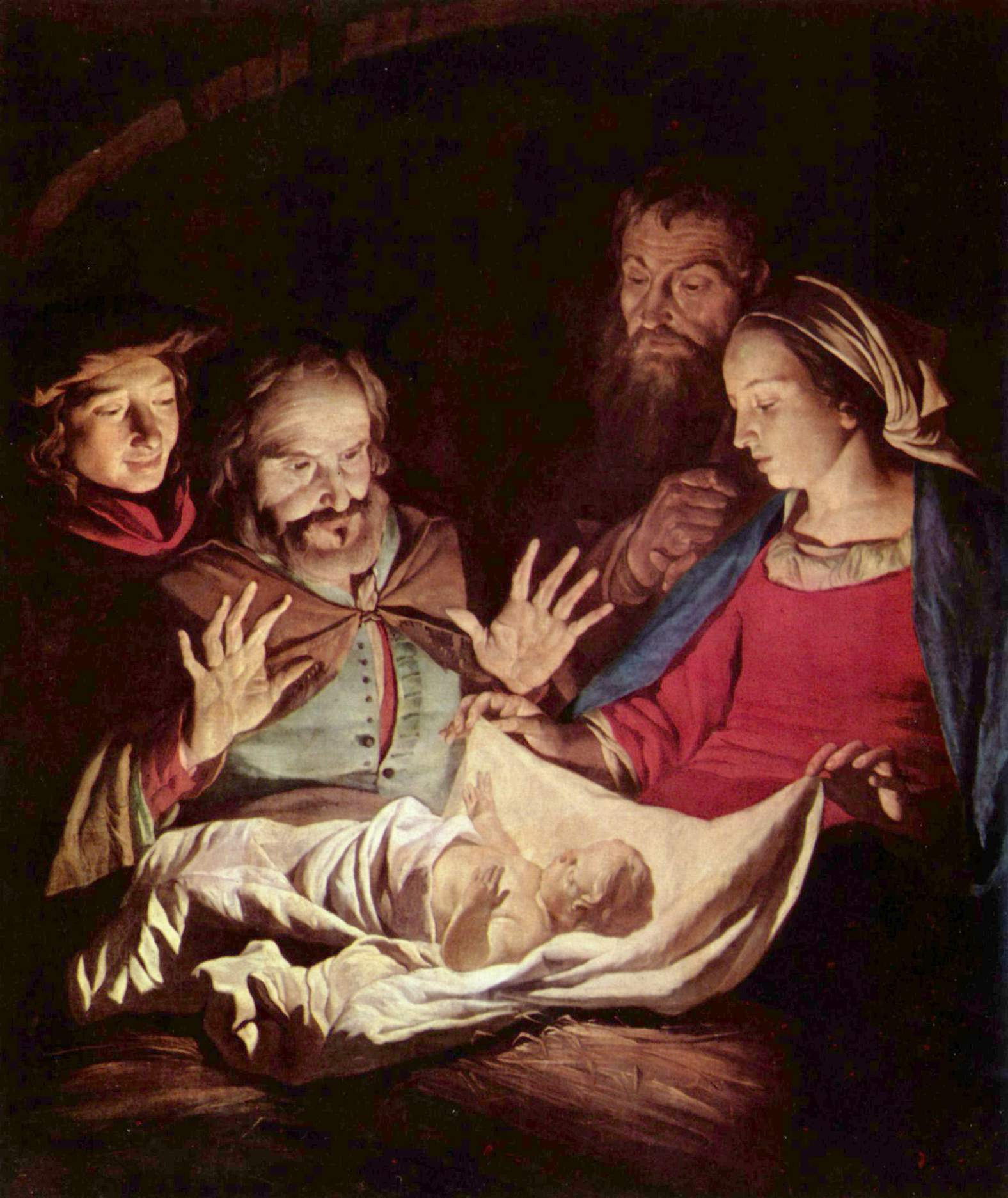
Adoration of the Shepherds by Matthias Stom, mid-17th century

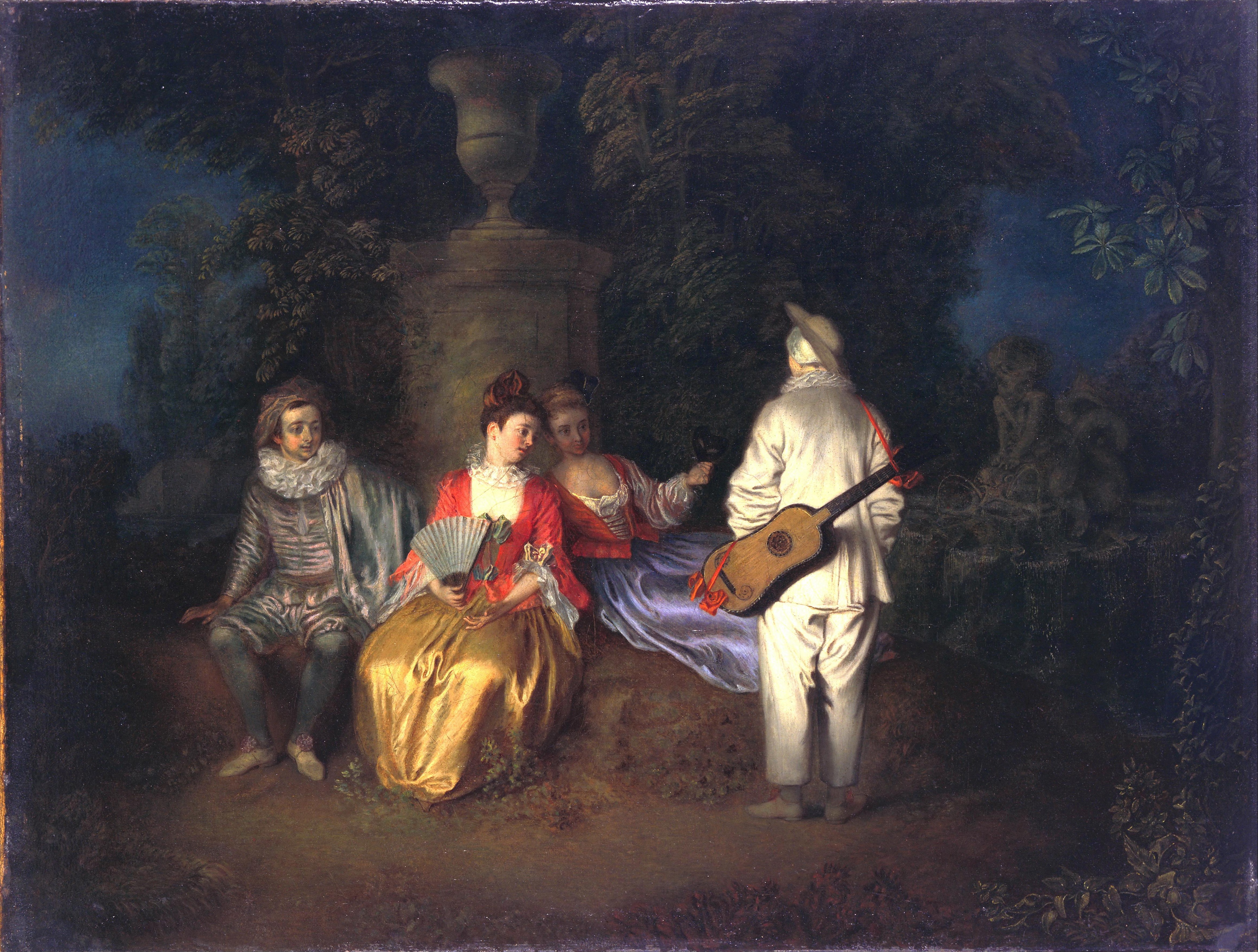
Antoine Watteau – La Partie carrée, c. 1713

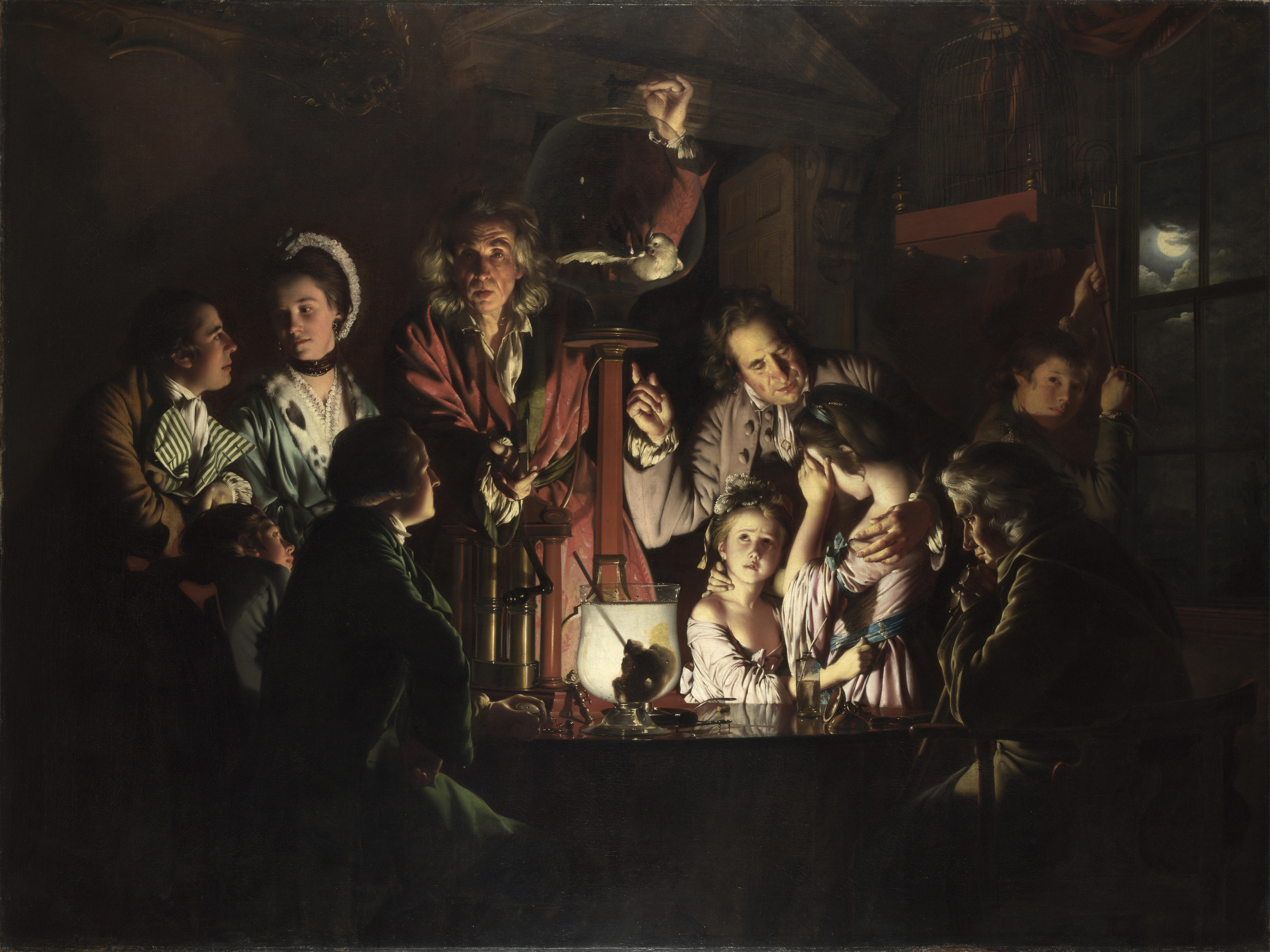
An Experiment on a Bird in the Air Pump by Joseph Wright of Derby, 1768

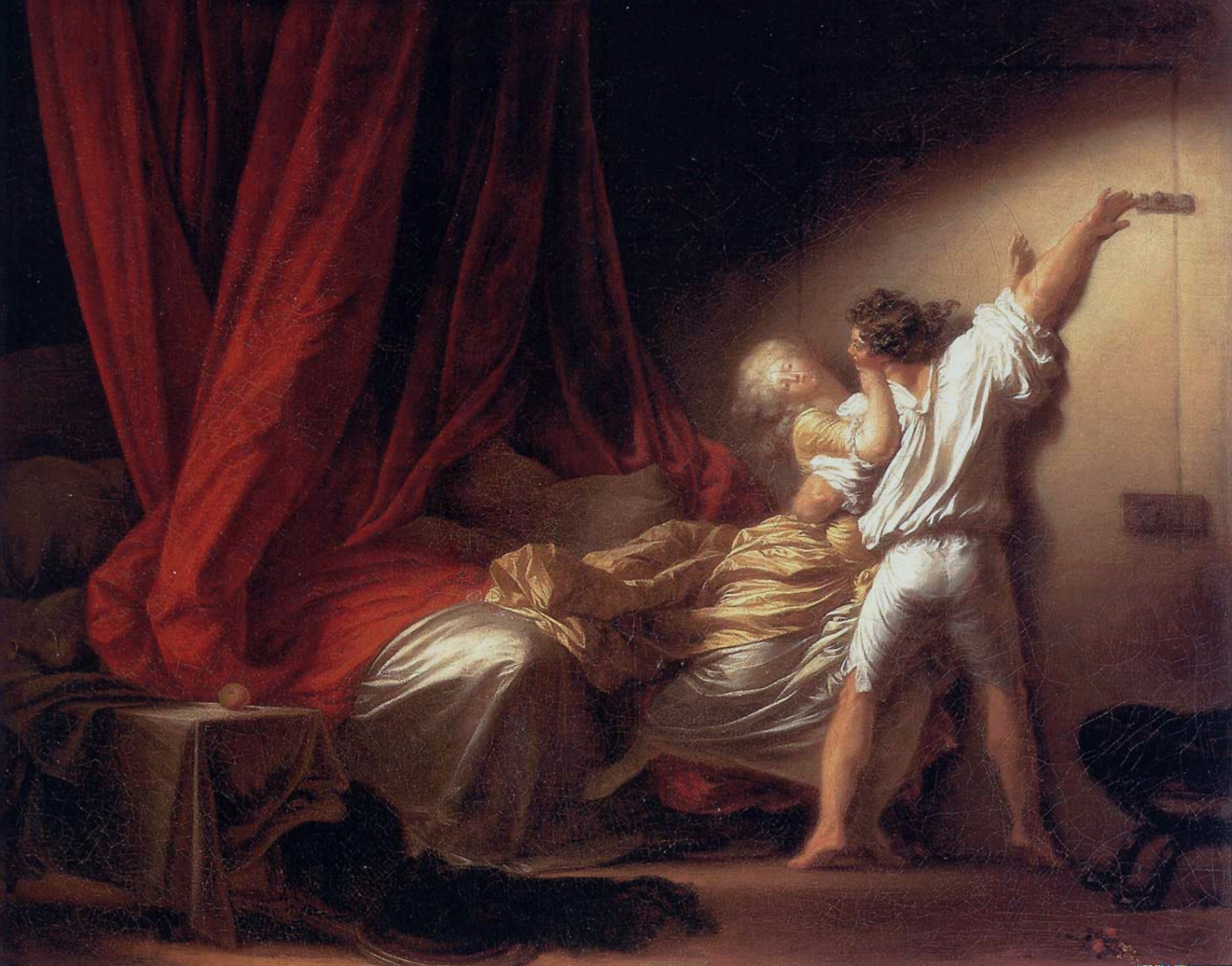
The Bolt by Jean-Honoré Fragonard, c. 1777

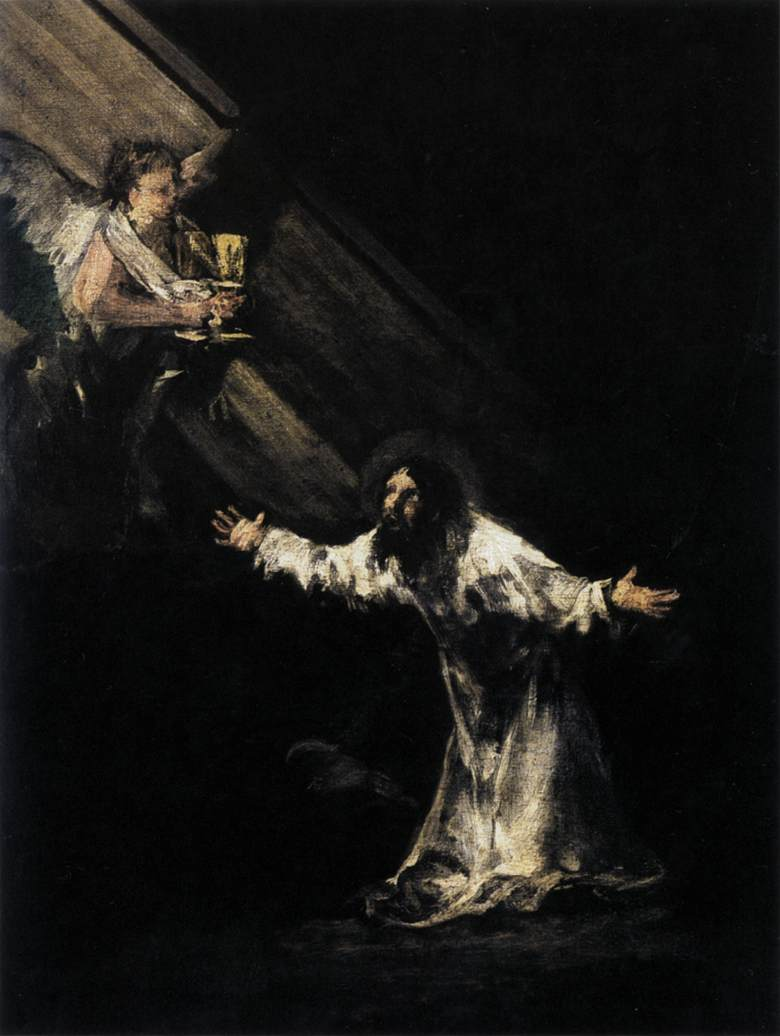
Christ on the Mount of Olives by Francisco Goya, 1819

Chiaroscuro as an element in composition: photography

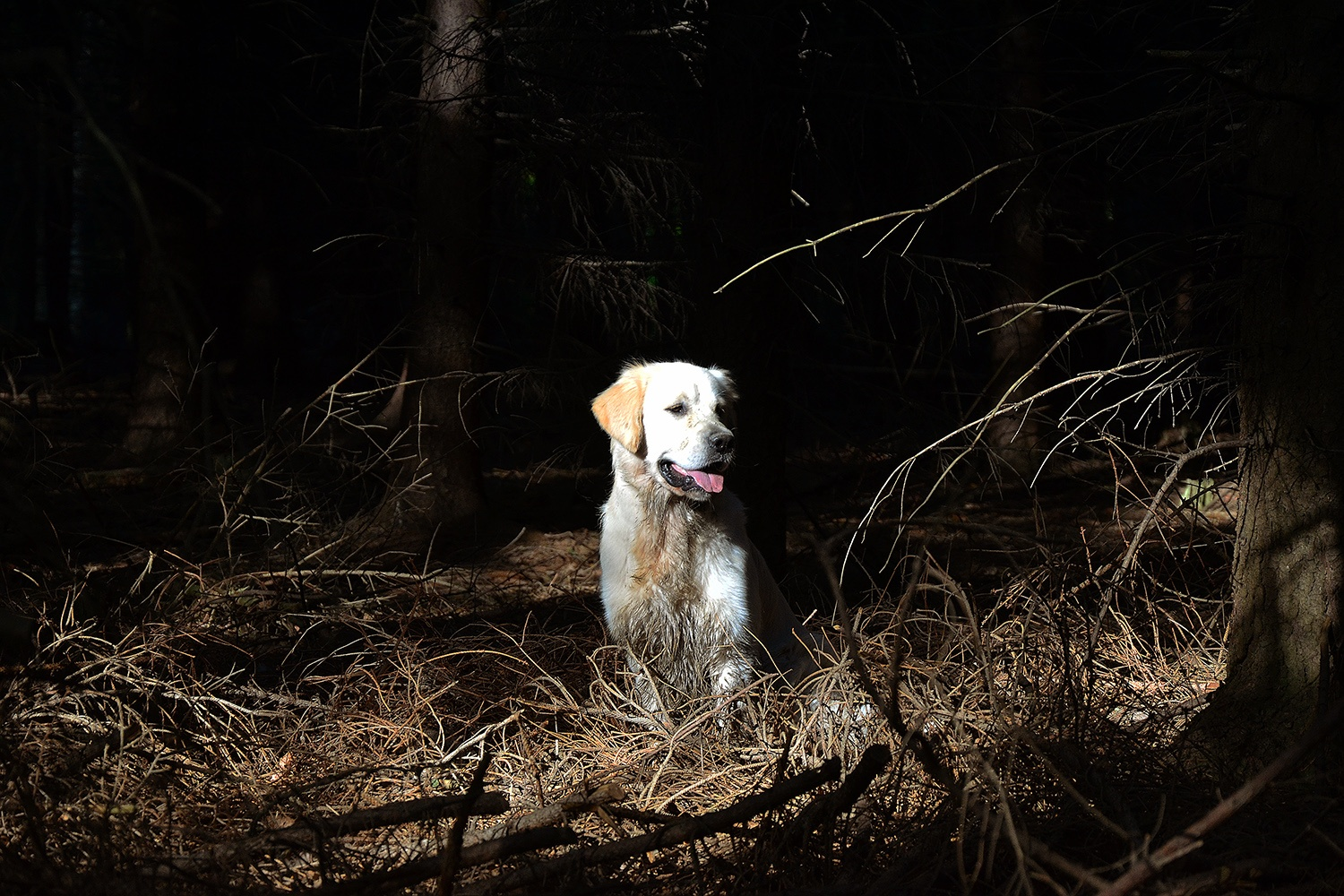

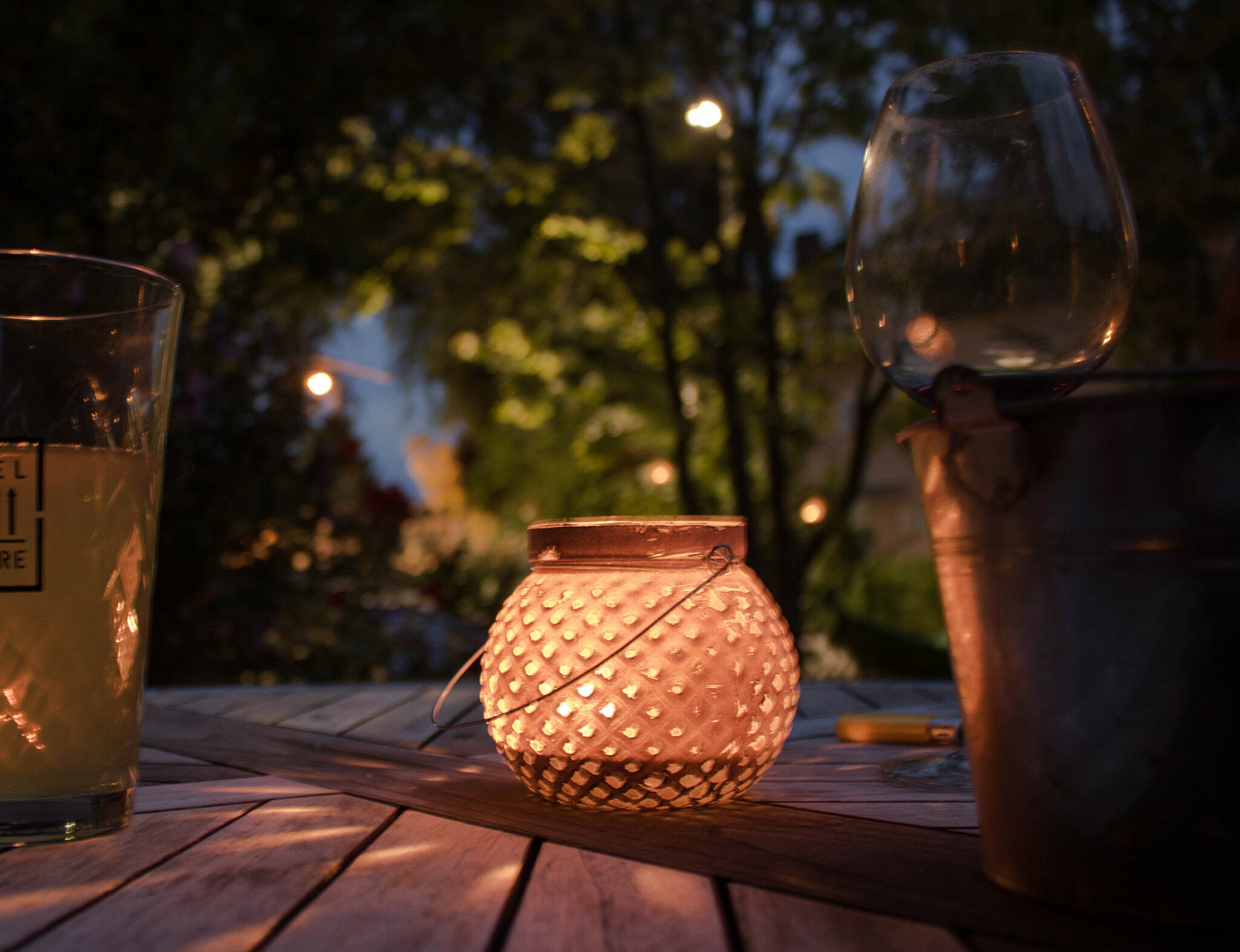

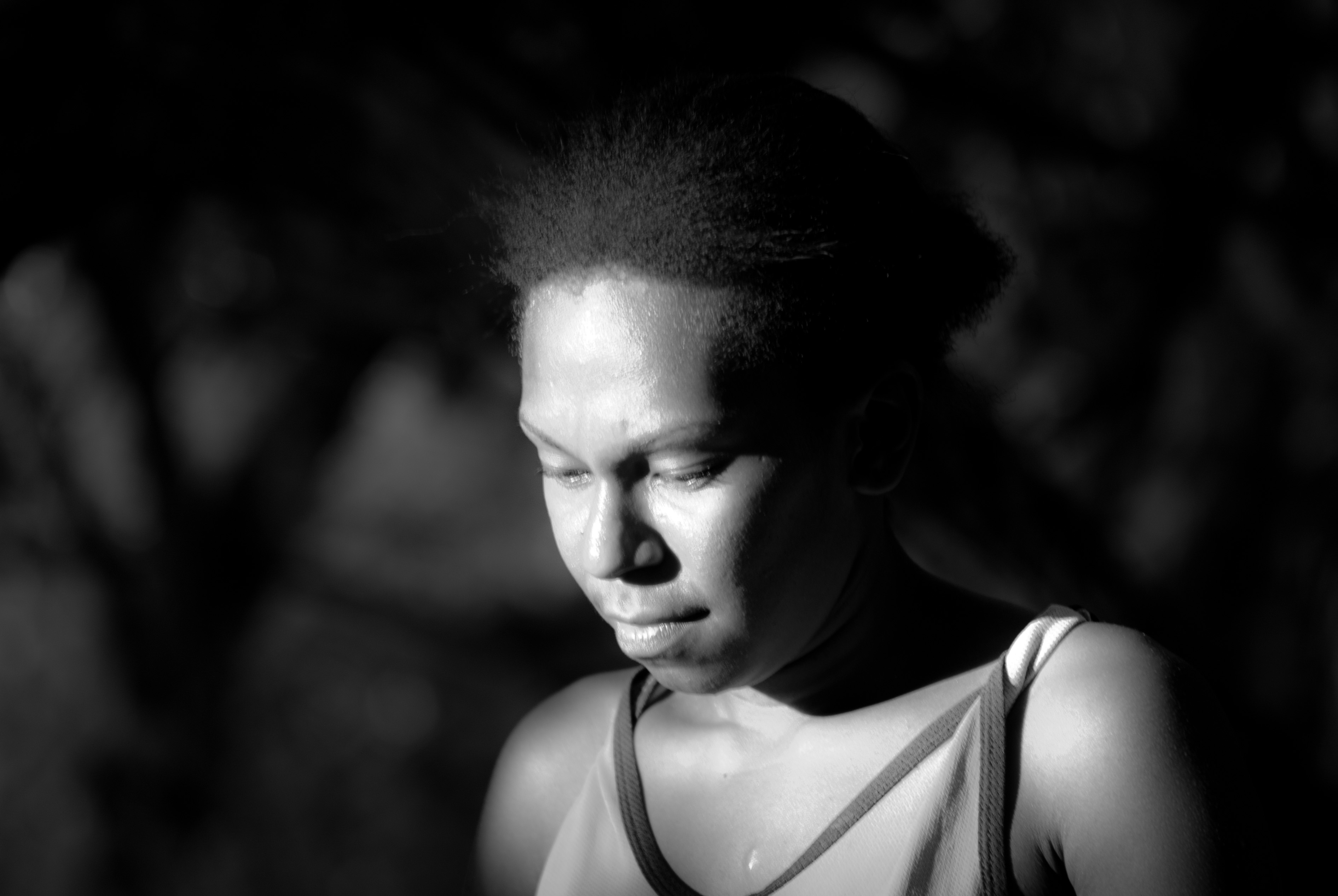

Chiaroscuro faces

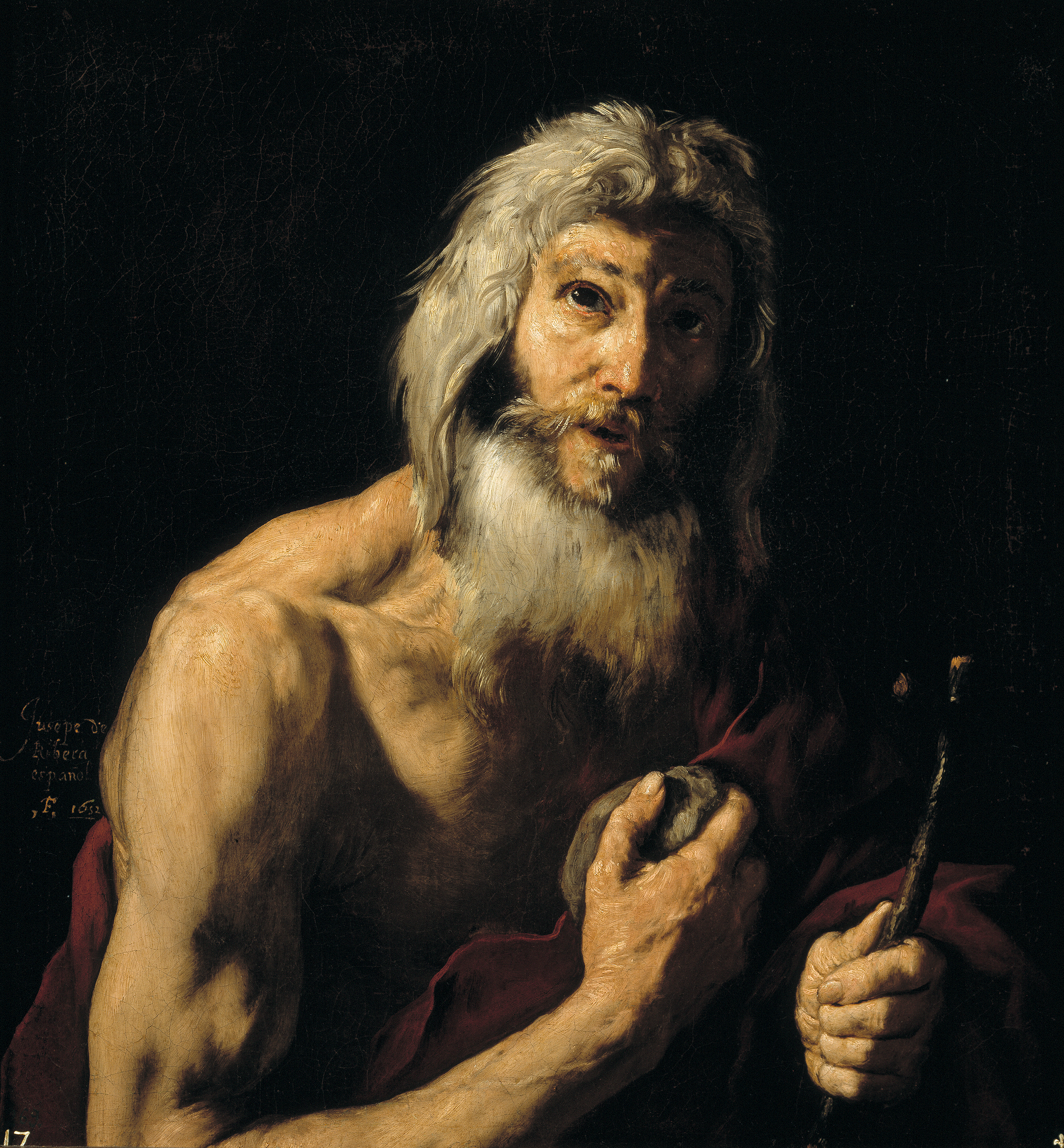
Saint Jerome by José de Ribera, 1652

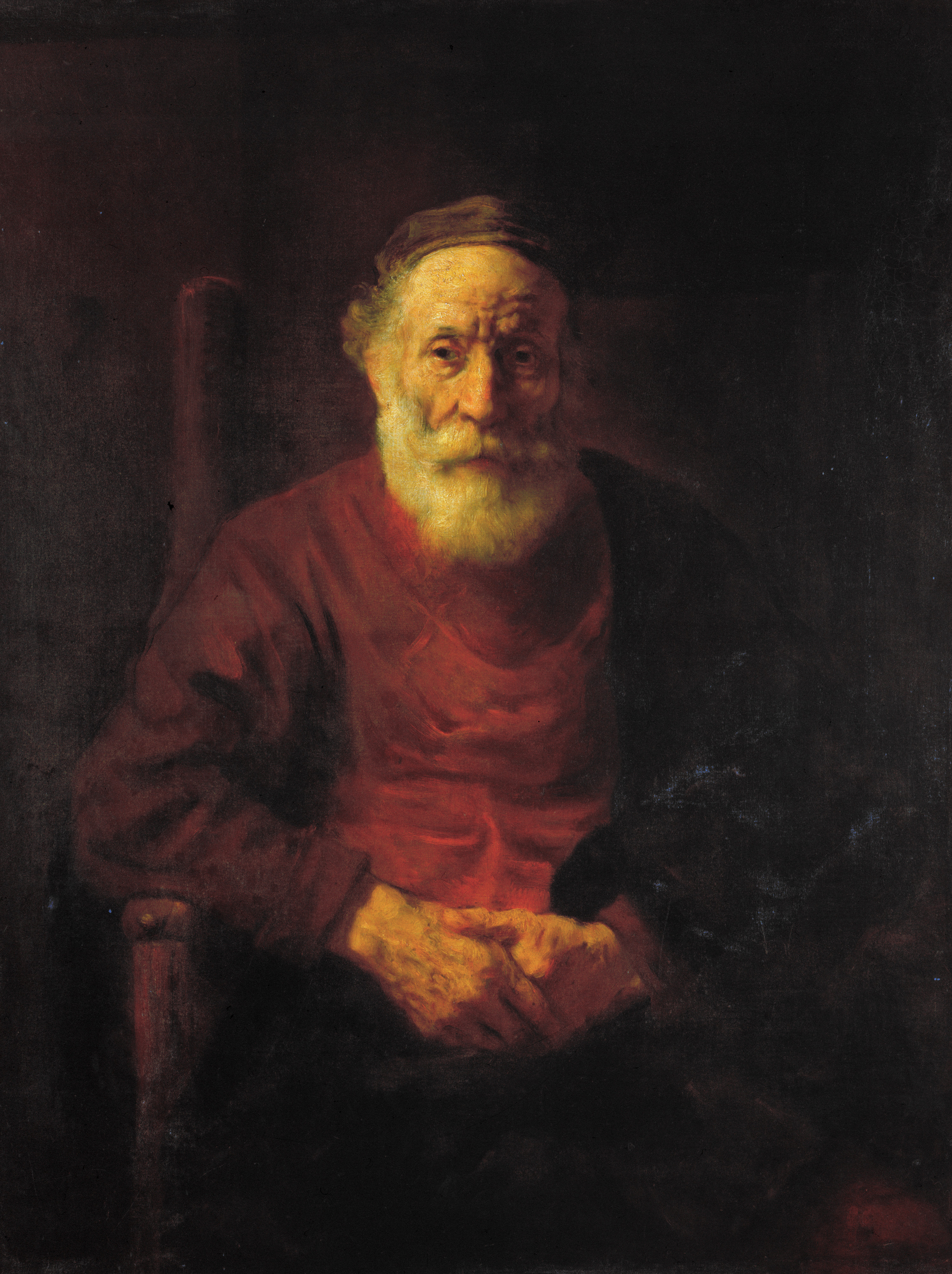
An Old Man in Red, by Rembrandt, 1652–1654

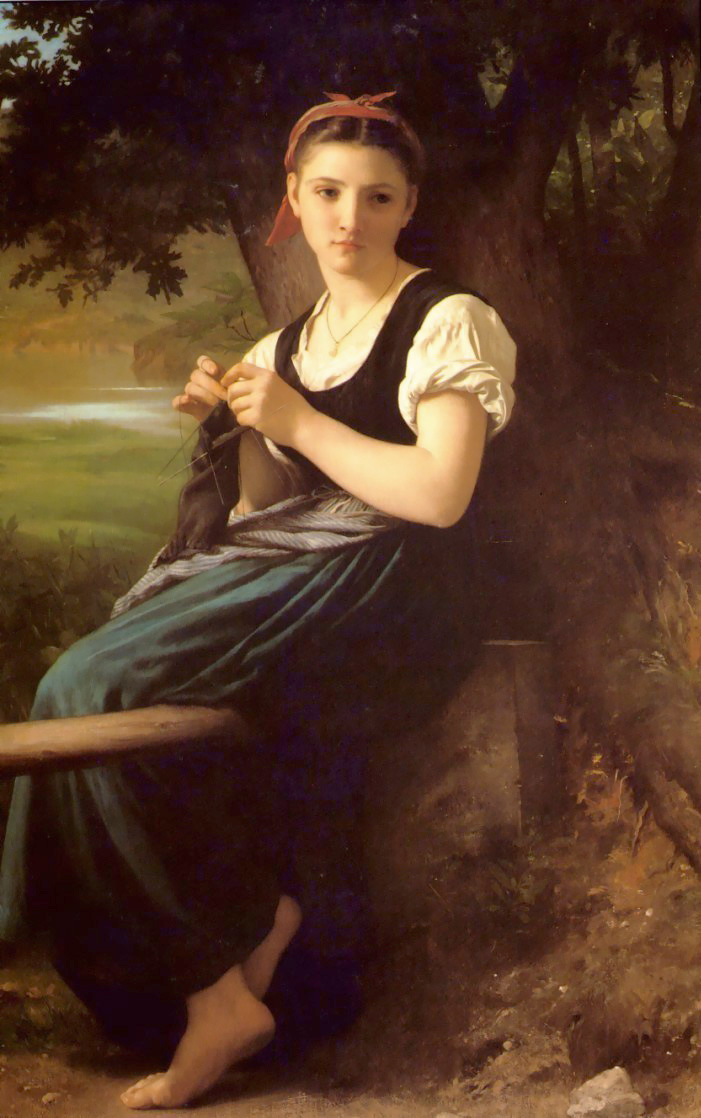
The Knitting Girl by William-Adolphe Bouguereau, 1869

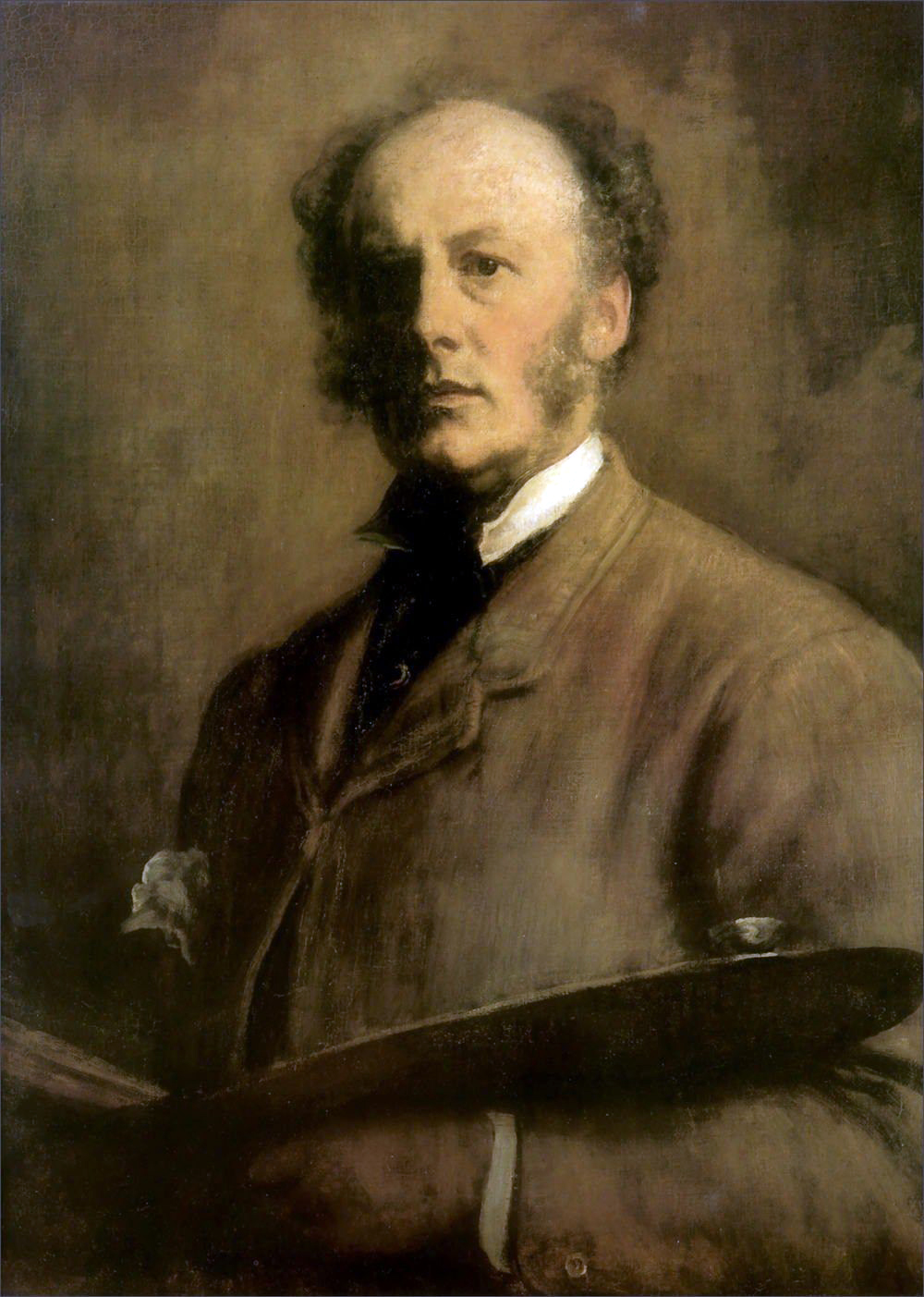
Self-Portrait by John Everett Millais, 1881

Chiaroscuro drawings and woodcuts

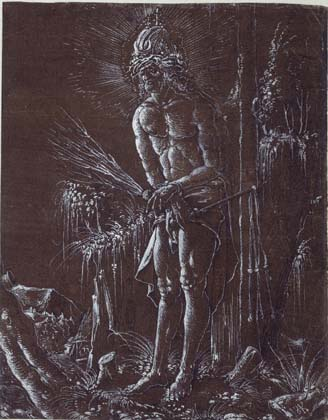
Man of Sorrows, chiaroscuro drawing on coloured paper, 1516, by Hans Springinklee

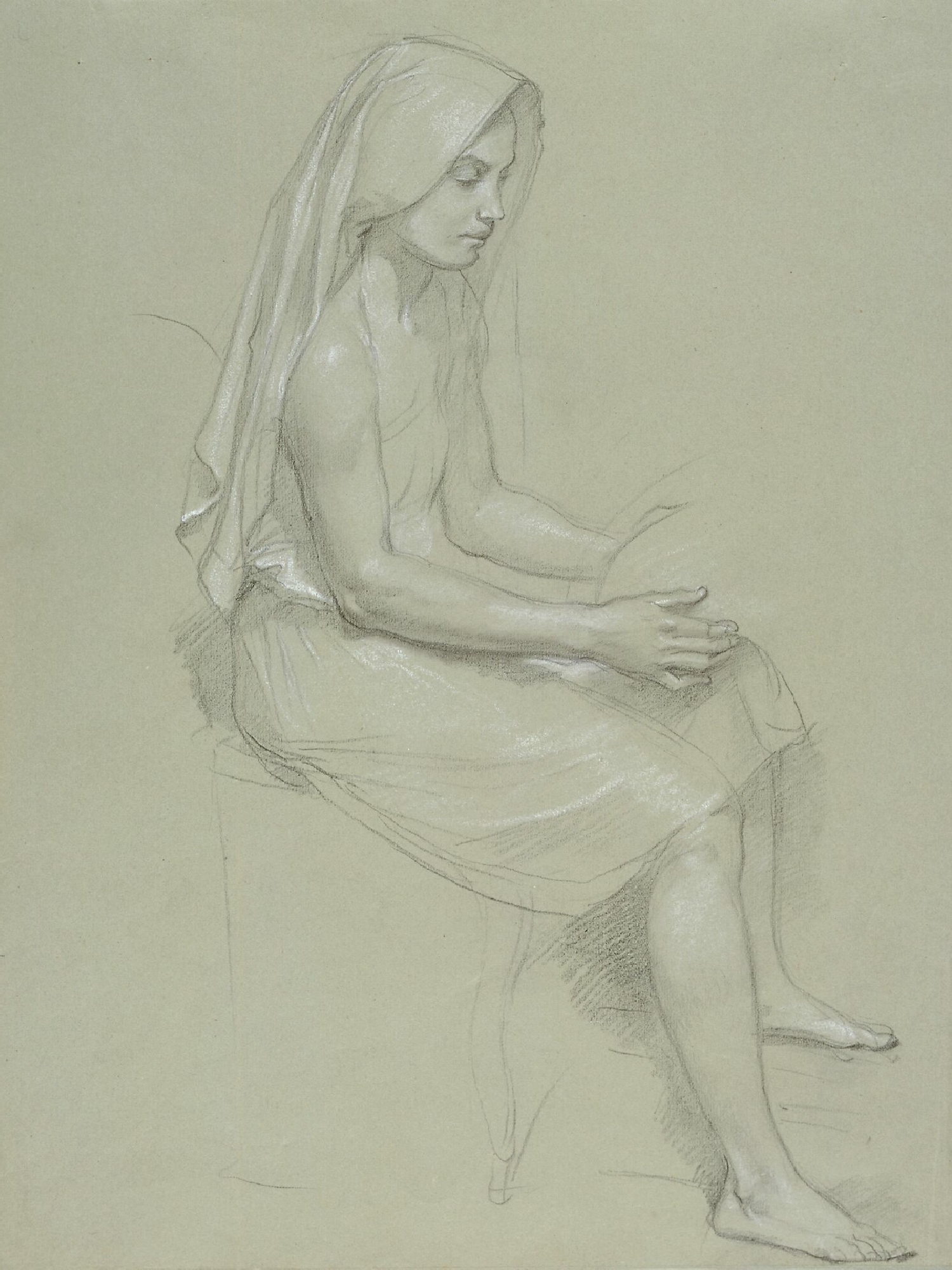
A nineteenth-century version of the original type of chiaroscuro drawing, with coloured paper, white gouache highlights, and pencil shading

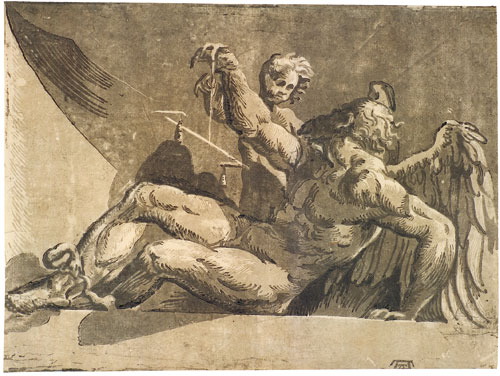
Saturn, anon. Italian, sixteenth-century?, Italian style chiaroscuro woodcut, with four blocks, but no real line block, and looking rather like a watercolour

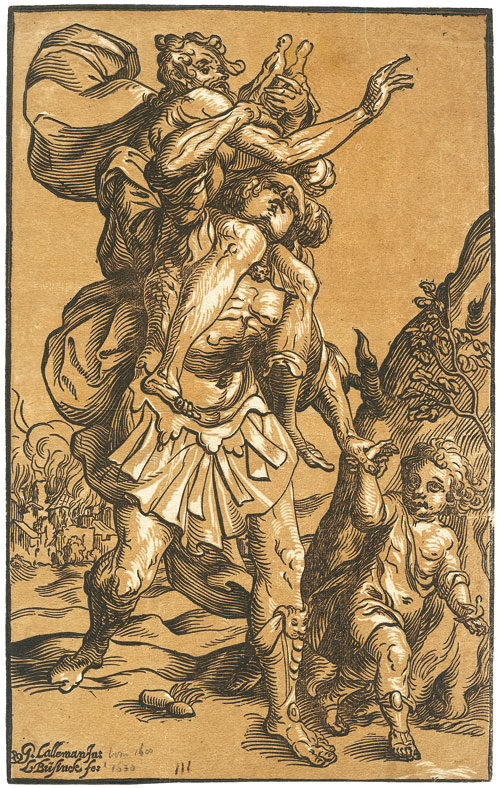
Ludolph Buesinck, Aeneas carries his father, German style, with line block and brown tone block

== See also ==
- Light-and-shade watermark
