= Light-and-shade watermark =

Watermarking technique

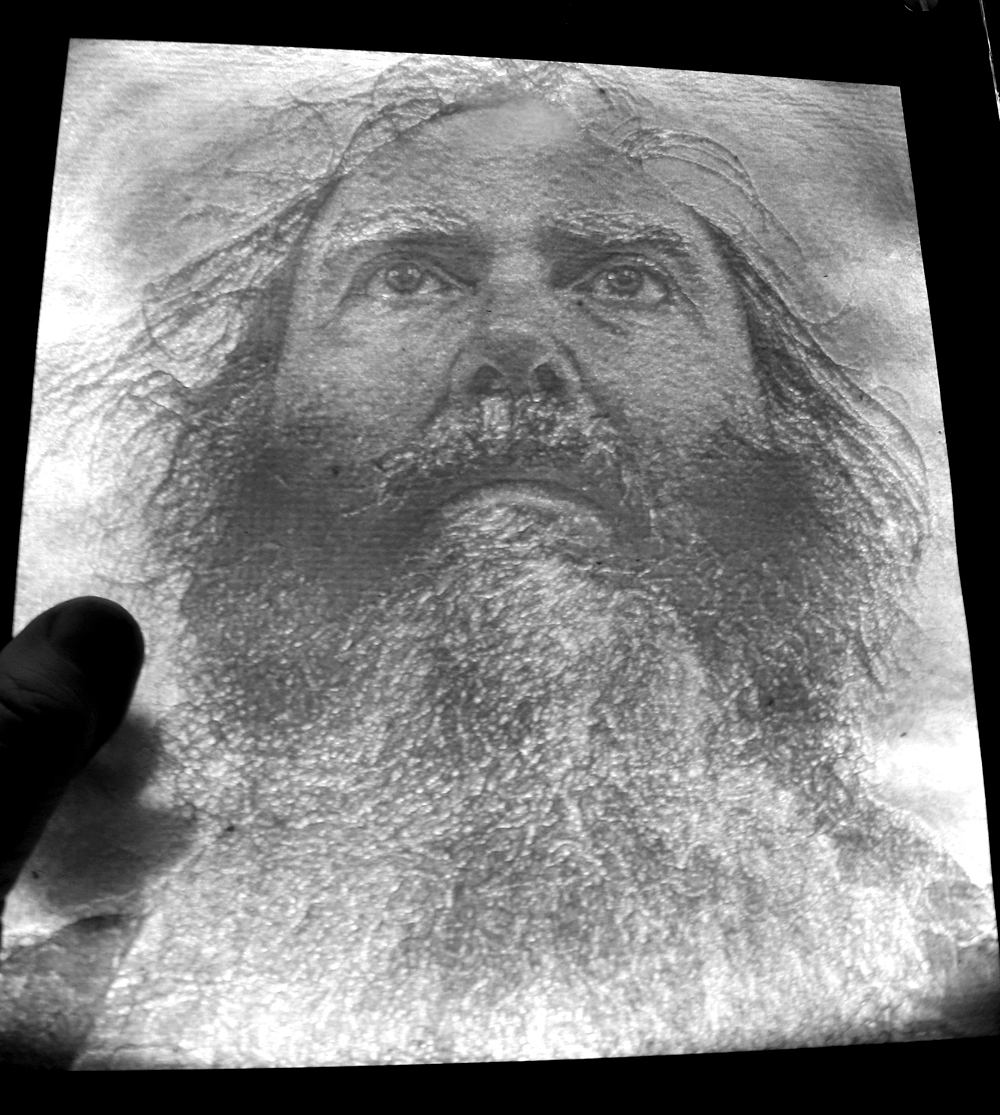
Chiaroscuro watermark. The artist Bill Fink is holding up the self portrait to light with the watermarked paper held in his hand.

A light-and-shade watermark, (Note: Also called a chiaroscuro watermark, a tonal, shaded, or shade-craft watermark, or a shadowmark) is a watermark image produced in a chiaroscuro style. In a traditional watermark, an image is produced in paper fibers by contrasting shades of light and dark in places where the paper is made thinner or thicker during the printing process. The resulting image has a high-contrast "black and white" quality with no graduated shading in between. In a chiaroscuro watermark, however, the fibers in the paper run from thin to thick, producing an image with many shades from light to dark. The technique was first developed in 1848 by William Henry Smith as a method to help prevent counterfeiting.

== Gallery ==
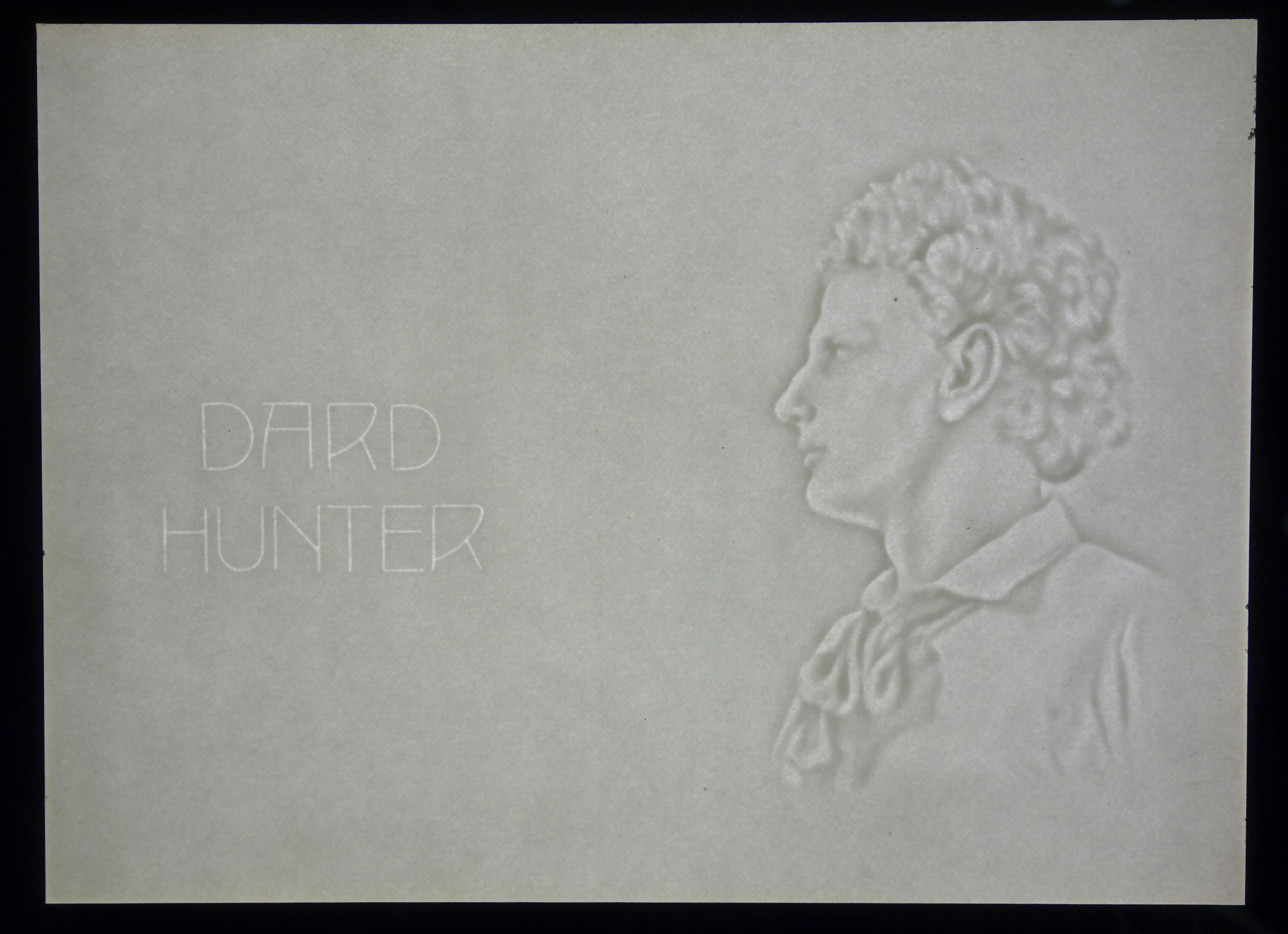
Portrait of Dard Hunter, well-known book maker, 1920s

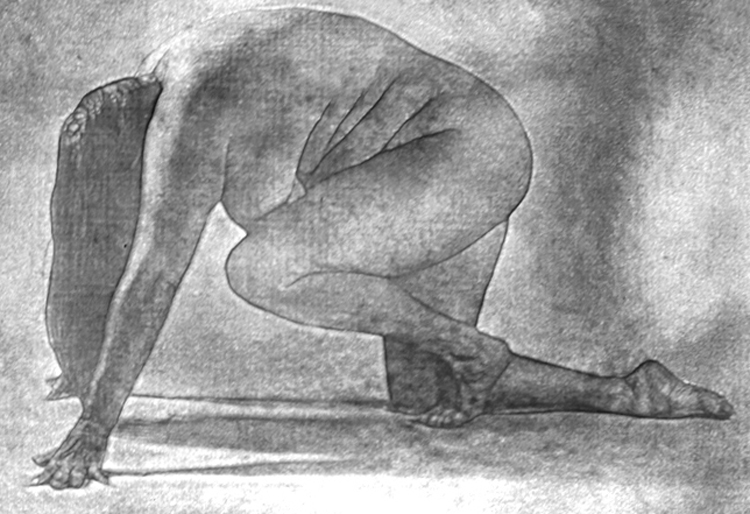
Image of a woman using a chiaroscuro watermark

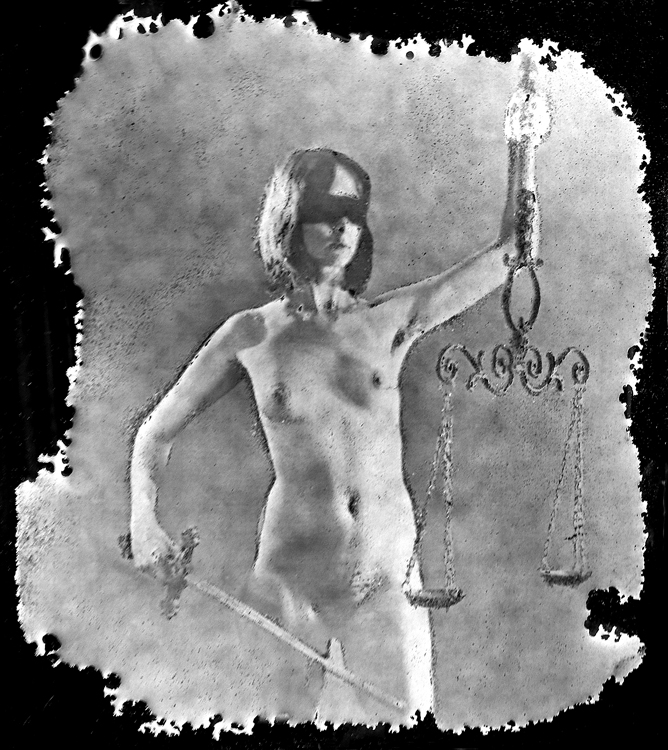
Nude woman depicted in chiaroscuro watermark

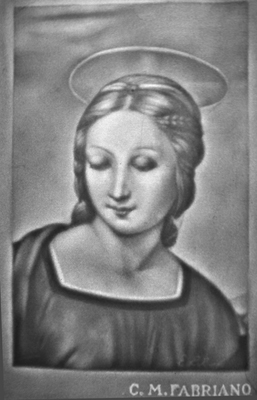
Chiaroscuro watermark by the Italian papermaker C.M. Fabriano
