= William Fink =

William G. Fink
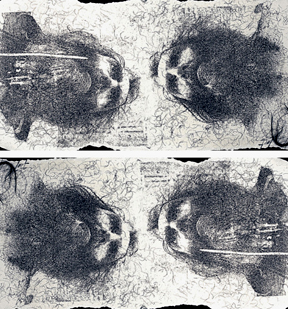
- Self-portrait composed by Fink using his own hair
- Born: 1954 (age 71–72)
- Education: California State Polytechnic University, Pomona
- Known for: Photography, photorealism, lithography
- Notable work: Bob
- Awards: First prize – Millard Sheets Center for the Arts photography competition 2007 'Bob'
- Website: finkart.com

William G. "Bill" Fink is a California-based American artist known for his technique for producing images of his subject matter by making the photograph itself out of soil, clippings of human hair, pollen, cremation ashes, etc. to simulate photorealistic vintage photographs of the person/ object/ location from which those media originally derived, and the images then printed in a light-sensitive alternative photographic process Fink describes as "Time and Matter Photography". Fink has laid claim to being the originator of the technique of using virtually any material in the place of traditional photo chemicals to create an image, saying, "There are silver prints, gold prints, and platinum prints-- precious from a metal standpoint-- but they embody nothing more than capturing time; ash is a way to capture both time and matter."

His works include an image of his left eye made from clippings of his own hair and an image of flowers made from the pollen of those flowers.

In 1992 he created an image of a man named Bob Christensen out of Christensen's ashes. Christensen died of AIDS in 1991 in Long Beach, California at the age of 39, and his mother donated the ashes to Fink in accordance with her son's wishes. Fink then took these ashes and created a photorealistic image of Christensen's face with them using his undisclosed technique. The image was considered controversial not only for its stark depiction of a person nearing death, but because of the unconventional medium of which Fink created it. Reactions of viewers during its two-month exhibition at the Valley HIV/AIDS Center in Van Nuys, California in 1992 ranged from understanding it as productive/ creative commentary on loss to offensive and insulting. The image is one of a series that Fink created of various people who had died of AIDS using their own cremated remains.

Museum curators have described Fink's work as innovative, with Diane Gaston from the Museum of Photographic Arts in San Diego identifying it as "socially as well as artistically important" and Bolton Colton from the Laguna Art Museum saying, "I find his work highly provocative and conceptually potent".

== Image gallery ==
Representative works
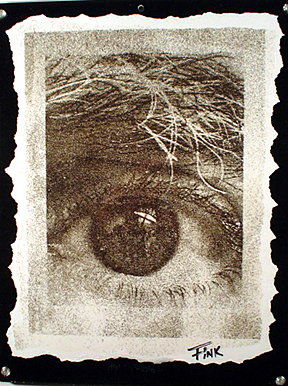
"My Eye"; this image was produced entirely from Fink's own hair clippings

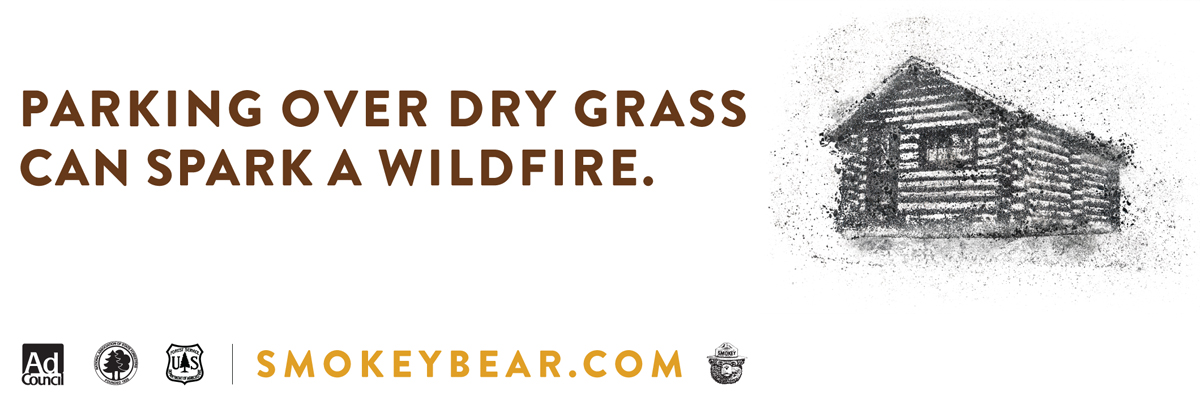
Ad Council image created using ashes from the Calabasas wildfire; part of a series of ash images made by Fink for the Ad Council

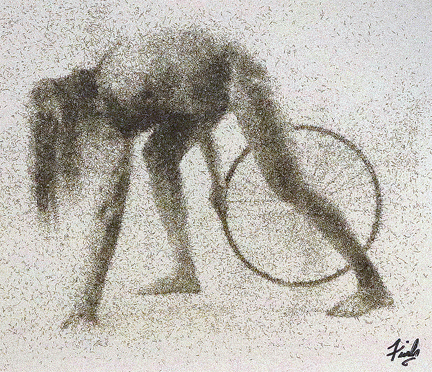
Image of a man made using clippings of his own hair

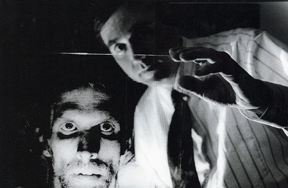
Image of a man named Bob Christensen who died of AIDS in the 1990s, made of Christensen's cremated remains
