= Sciography =

Study of perspective shadow projection

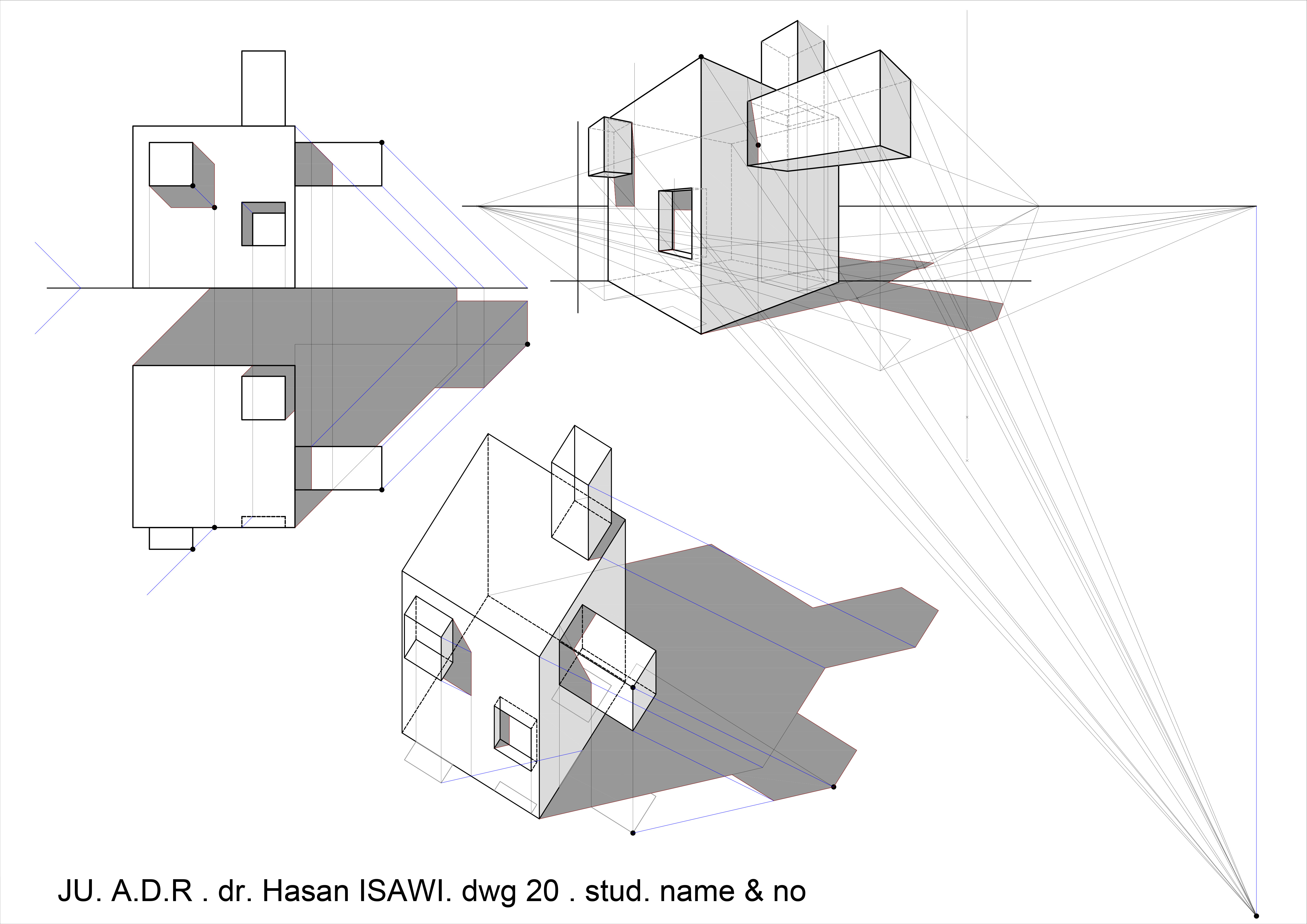
Shadows depicted in an architectural drawing

Sciography, or sciagraphy, is a term for the graphical technique of depicting shadows on objects, or cast by objects. It is often used to create an illusion of depth in a two-dimensional image, particularly in architectural drawing. The term comes from the Greek σκιά "shadow" and γράφειν graphein, "to write".

In general sciography, the light source is imagined as the sun inclined at 45 degrees to both the vertical plane and the horizontal plane coming from the left side. The resultant shadow is then 'projected' onto an adjacent surface in the drawing.

== Bibliography ==
- Baxandall, Michael (1997). Shadows and Enlightenment. Yale University Press. pp. 84–88. ISBN 0300072724.
- M'Intyre, John H. A. (1901). A Text-book of Sciography: Arranged to Meet the Requirements of Architects and Draughtsmen and of Students Preparing for Advanced Perspective and for the Advanced and Honours Stages of Practical Plane and Solid Geometry. Blackie & Son.
