= Raadi =

Raadi may refer to:

- Raadi, Tartu County, borough in Estonia
- Raadi or Raadi-Kruusamäe, neighbourhood of Tartu
- Raadi Airfield
- Raadi Manor
- Lake Raadi, lake in Tartu County, Estonia
