= Raadi-Kruusamäe =

Neighbourhood of Tartu

Coordinates: 58°23′38.92″N 26°44′0.41″E

Raadi
- Neighbourhood of Tartu
- Raadi-Kruusamäe
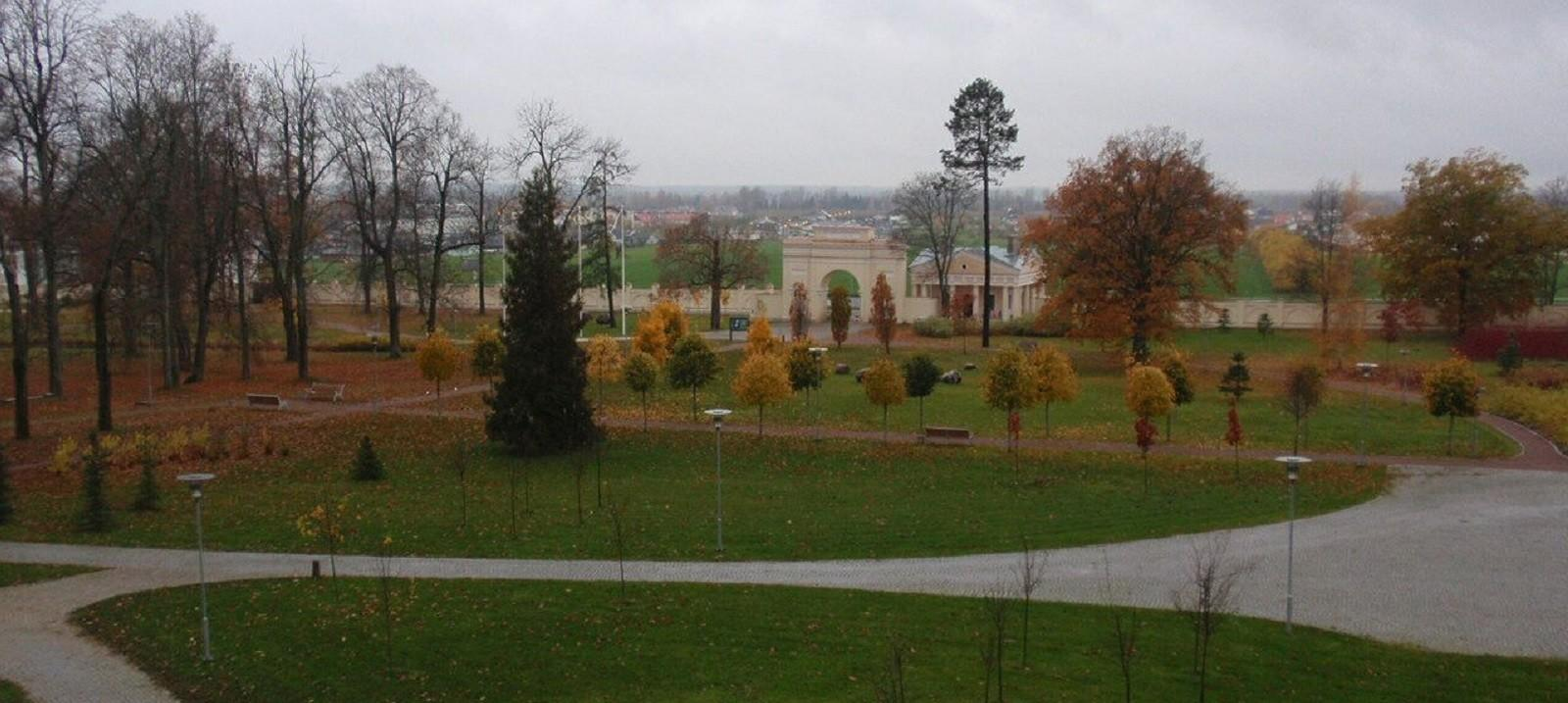
- Raadi Park

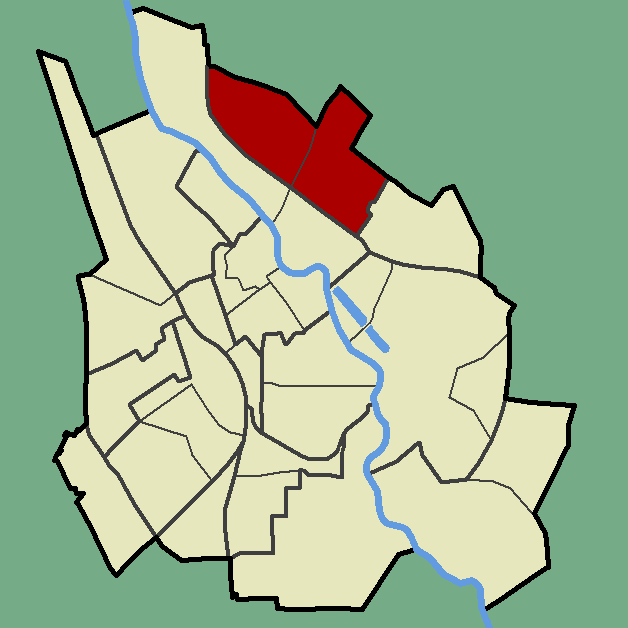
- Location of Raadi-Kruusamäe in Tartu
- Country: Estonia
- County: Tartu County
- City: Tartu

Area
  - Total: 2.83 km^{2} (1.09 sq mi)

Population (31.12.2013)
  - Total: 4,498
  - Density: 1,590/km^{2} (4,120/sq mi)
- Postal code: 50303

Raadi-Kruusamäe, or Raadi for short, is a neighbourhood of Tartu, Estonia. It has a population of 4,498 (as of 31 December 2013) and an area of 2.83 km^{2} (1.09 mi^{2}). Raadi is mainly suburban area.

The name Raadi comes from Raadi Manor (German: Ratshof), which belonged to the town council (Rat) of Tartu in medieval times. The Manor was first mentioned on a card in 1688. The manor housed the Estonian National Museum 1922–1944, but was heavily damaged in World War II due to the bombings from Soviet Army. New building for the museum was opened in 2016 and the Manor is currently in ruins, but it has been suggested to move Tartu Art Museum to the restored Manor building.

In 2020, estimated 200,000 solar panels will be built on Raadi Airfield, making it the biggest solar farm in Estonia.

== Main sights ==
Main sights of Raadi include Estonian National Museum, Raadi Manor complex, Raadi cemetery, Tartu Upside Down House, Tartu Adventure Park, Kobraste and Ülejõe Beach.

Punk festival Punk'n'Roll has been hosted annually at the Lake Raadi since 2012. Tartu Midsummer is hosted at the Raadi Manor complex.

== Nature ==
Four out of six nature reserves of Tartu are located in Raadi. These include Raadi Park, Aruküla caves, Devonian sandstone outcrop and Pseudotsuga parkway in the Raadi cemetery.

== Business and industry ==
Hanza Group manufacturing buildings are located in Raadi.

== Gallery ==
Estonian National Museum

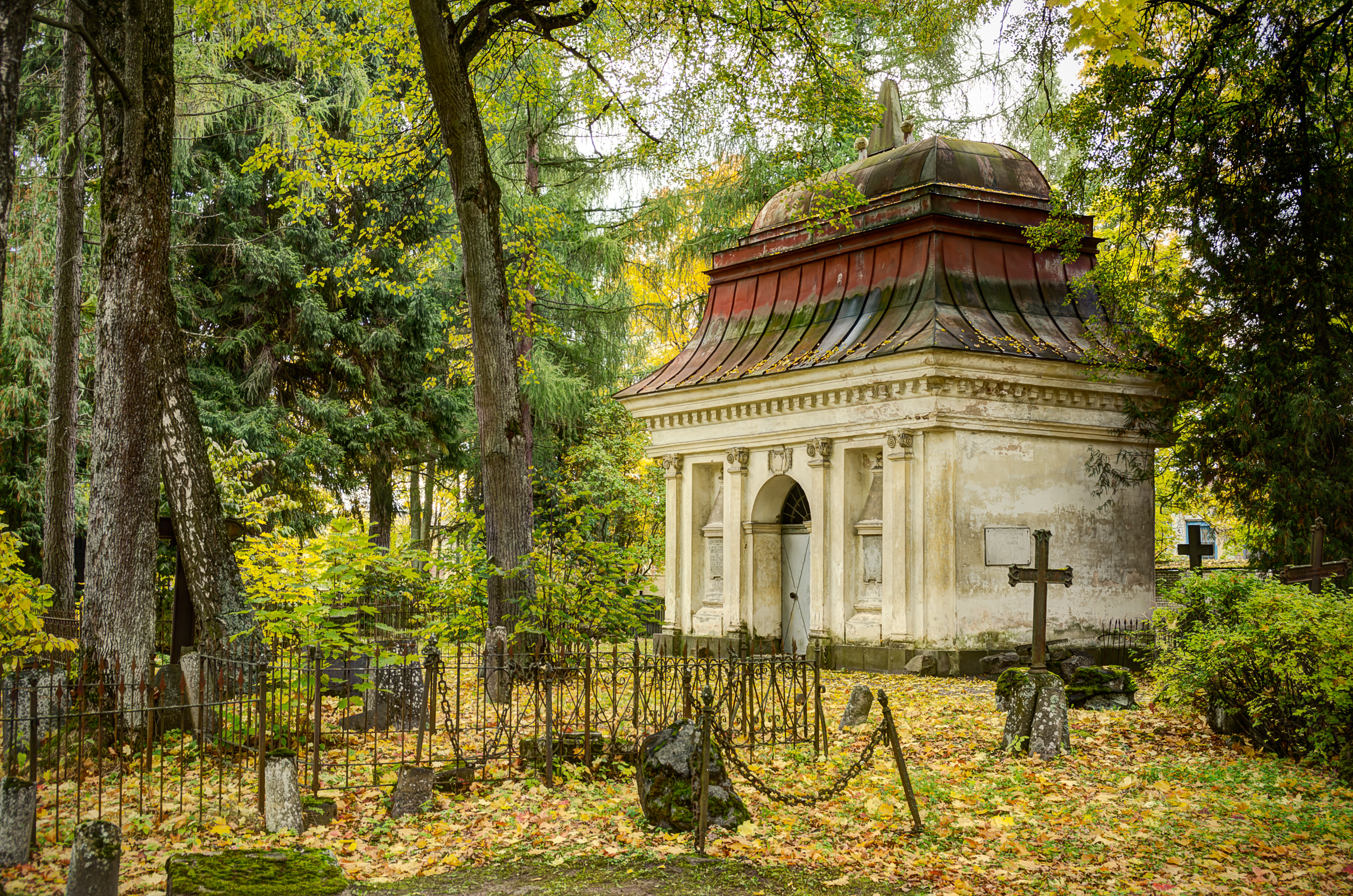
Raadi Cemetery, Teller's Chapel

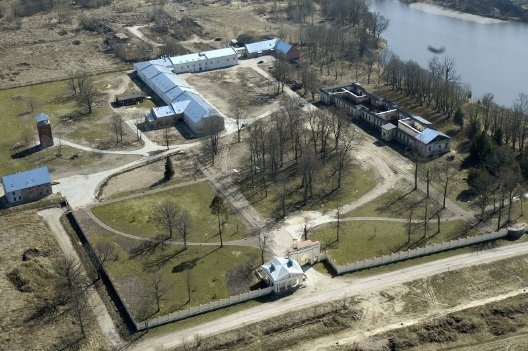
Raadi Manor Complex

== See also ==
- Raadi cemetery
- Raadi Manor
- Lake Raadi
- Raadi Airfield
- Estonian National Museum
