= Benois Madonna =

Painting by Leonardo da Vinci

The Benois Madonna
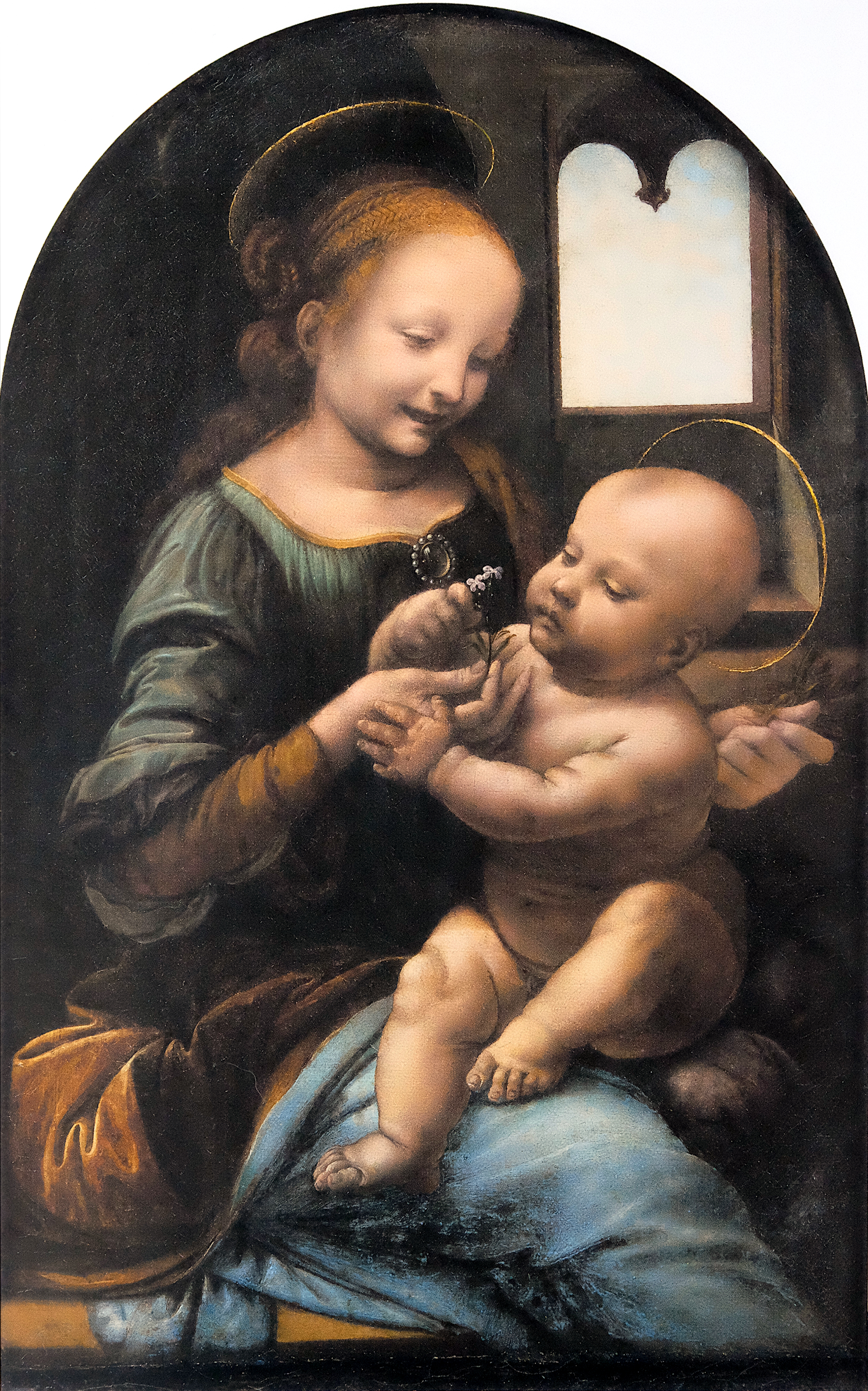
- Artist: Leonardo da Vinci
- Year: c. 1478–1480
- Medium: Oil on canvas
- Dimensions: 49.5 cm × 33 cm (19.5 in × 13 in)
- Location: Hermitage Museum, Saint Petersburg

The Benois Madonna, otherwise known as the Madonna and Child with Flowers, is a painting by the Italian Renaissance master Leonardo da Vinci in the Hermitage Museum, Saint Petersburg. One of two Madonnas begun by Leonardo in October 1478, it was completed c. 1478–1480; the other was the Madonna of the Carnation, now in the Alte Pinakothek, Munich.

== History ==
It is likely that the Benois Madonna was the first work painted by Leonardo independently from his master Andrea del Verrocchio. Two of Leonardo's preliminary sketches for this work are in the British Museum, although the painting was probably overpainted by other hands. The preliminary sketches and the painting itself suggest that Leonardo was concentrating on the idea of sight and perspective. (Note: At that time it was thought that alien eyes emitted rays to cause vision with a central beam being the most important.) The child is thought to be guiding his mother's hands for the flower to get into his central vision.

The Benois Madonna has proved to be one of Leonardo's most popular works. It was extensively copied by young painters, including Raphael in his Madonna of the Pinks in the National Gallery, London.

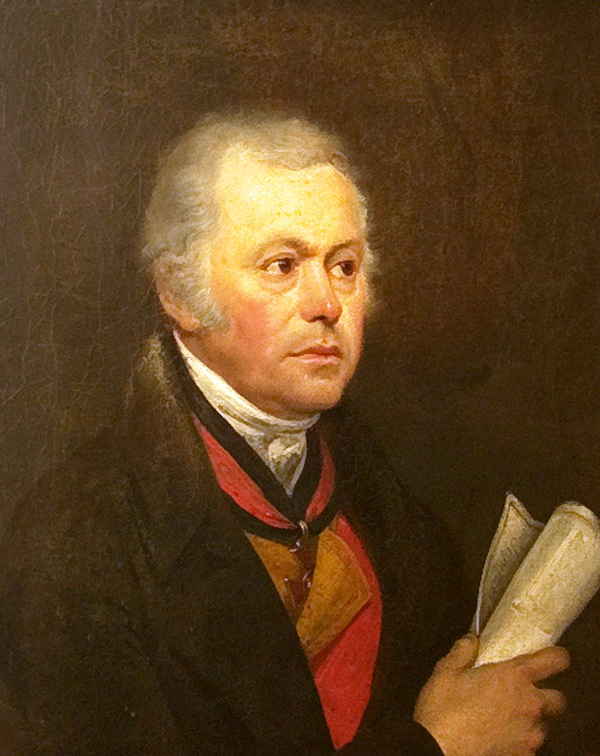
A. I. Korsakov, 1808, by Orest Kiprensky

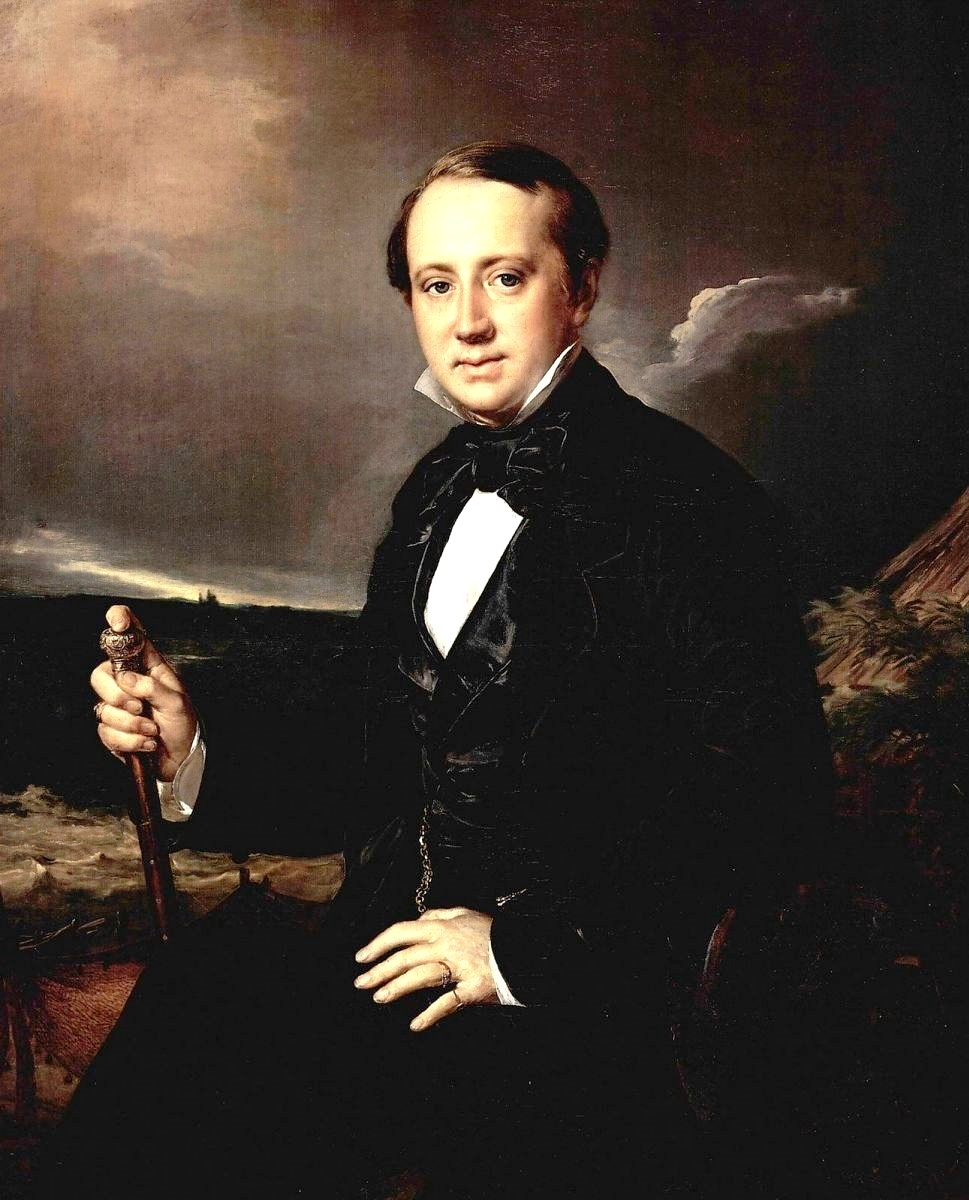
A. A. Sapozhnikov, 1852, by Vasily Tropinin

For centuries, the painting was presumed to have been lost, then found, then lost, then found, then lost. It had in fact been acquired in Italy by the Russian artillery general and art connoisseur Aleksei Ivanovich Korsakov (1751–1821) in the 1790s. (Note: Descending from a medieval noble family in Novgorod, Korsakov was an artillery general and senator under Paul I and Alexander I. Elected in 1794 as an Honorary Member of the Russian Academy of Arts for "knowledge, love and respect of honourable arts", his later years in Saint Peterburg were devoted to collecting rare objets d'art, sculptures and paintings.) Upon Korsakov's death, his son sold it for the sum of 1,400 roubles to the Astrakhan fishing merchant Alexander Petrovich Sapozhnikov, who had his own art gallery; it was then passed on to his wealthy philanthropist son Alexander Alexendrovich Sapozhnikov (1827–1887). Finally, when his daughter Maria Sapozhnikova (1858–1938) married the architect Leon Benois (1856–1928), the painting became part of the inheritance of the Benois family.

In 1909, the painting was sensationally exhibited in Saint Petersburg as part of the Benois collection. In 1912, the Benois family considered selling the painting and requested an appraisal from the London art dealer Joseph Duveen, who gave an evaluation of 500,000 francs. The art historian Bernard Berenson made disparaging comments about the painting, raising doubts about its authenticity:

One unhappy day I was called to see the 'Benois Madonna'. I found myself confronted by a young woman with a bald forehead and puffed cheeks, a toothless smile, blear eyes, and a furrowed throat. The uncanny, anile apparition plays with a child who looks like a hollow mask fixed on inflated body and limbs. The hands are wretched, the folds purposeless and fussy, the color like whey. And yet I had to acknowledge that this painful affair was the work of Leonardo da Vinci. It was hard, but the effort freed me, and the indignation I felt gave me the resolution to proclaim my freedom.

Despite these wrangles about attribution, however, the Benois Madonna was eventually sold to the Imperial Hermitage Museum in 1914 for a record amount. The purchase was made by Ernst Friedrich von Liphart, (Note: Liphart's father, Baron Karl Eduard von Liphart from Estonia, was an expert on art history. He accompanied his son in the 1860s during their travels to Florence. He disinherited his son in 1873 following his conversion to Catholicism and his subsequent marriage to a Florentine lady.) then curator of paintings at the Hermitage, who identified Leonardo as the artist. The payments were made in installments, continuing even after the 1917 October Revolution. Since 1914 the painting has been exhibited in the Hermitage Museum, Saint Petersburg.

== Description and interpretation ==
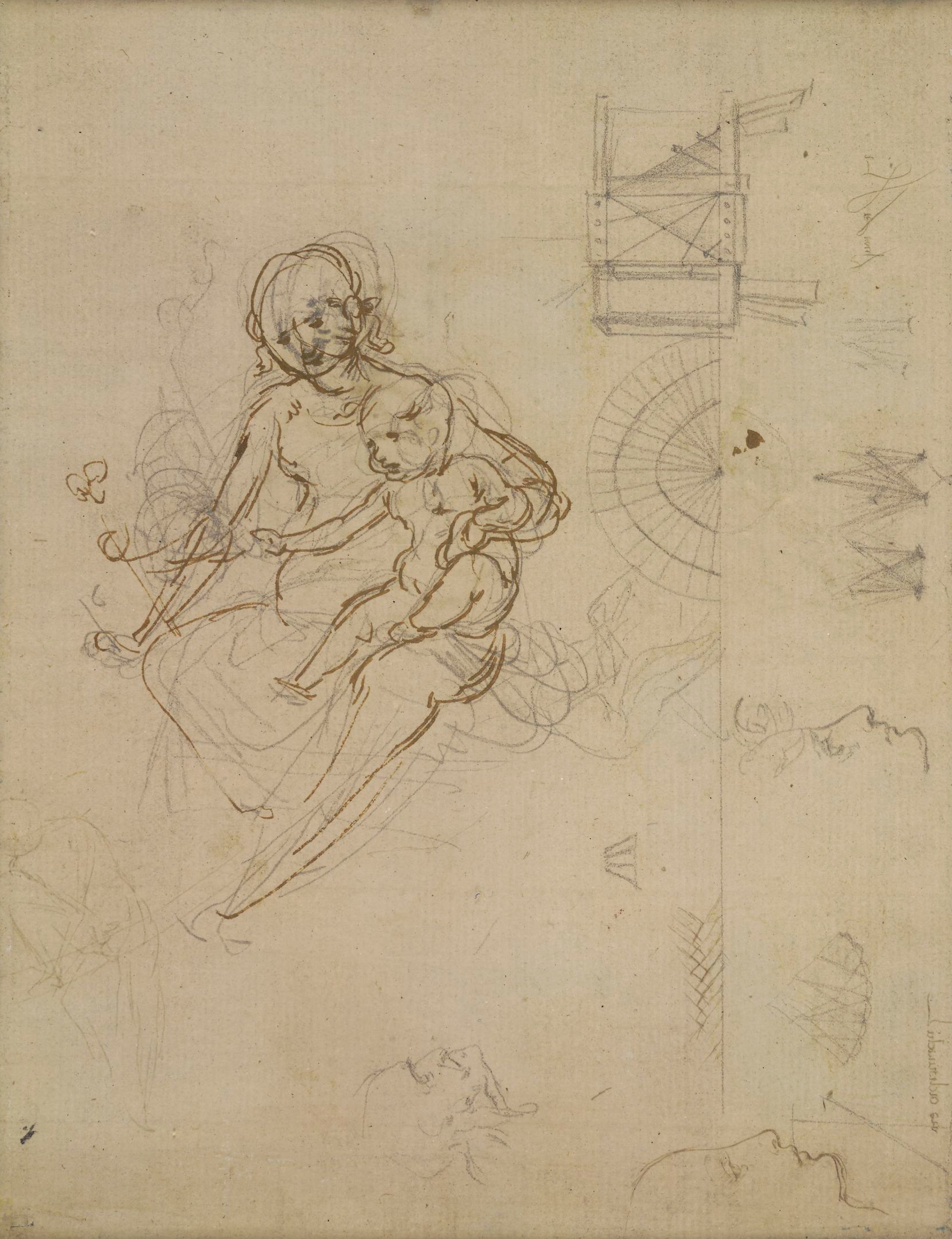
Leonardo da Vinci, Optical studies for the Virgin and Child (c. 1478–1480), British Museum

This small painting shows a dark room with the Virgin seated on a bench with her Child outstretched on her lap. Her young rounded face is lively; she is clothed in an olive and brown raiment, with brown and blue underwear covering her knees. The amply proportioned Christ Child grasps a cruciform sprig of flowers which the Virgin is holding. The faces of the vividly coloured figures are crowned with delicately gilded haloes. In an otherwise dark interior, a double-arched aperture gives a glimpse on to pale blue skies.

In Renaissance Florence, artistic portrayals of the Madonna often used Christian symbolism to suggest foreknowledge of the Crucifixion — for example, the goldfinch plucking Christ’s thorns from his crown. For the Benois Madonna, the symbol is a flowering sprig, in the form of a crucifix, held by the Virgin. As Feinberg (2011) suggests, in the Benois Madonna Leonardo attempted to rationalize between the mysteries of 'sight' and 'insight': "The child of the Benois Madonna has still not responded to the distinctly cruciform shape of the flower [...] because he cannot see it clearly. Once that happens, the child's hazy curiosity could [...] lead to foresight of his sacrifice". Notwithstanding its solemn motif, the painting represents one of the "most joyous and youthful depiction of Mary in Renaissance art ... she seems to be speaking or laughing, playfully engaged with her child, her radiant vitality accentuated through Leonardo’s deliberate complications of posture and drapery".

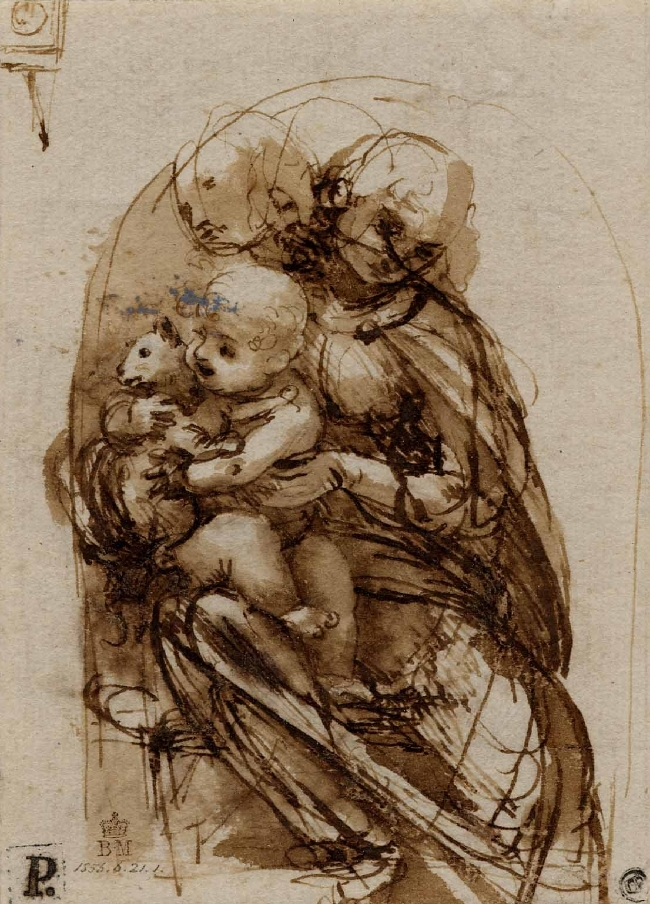
Study for the Madonna of the Cat, British Museum (verso)

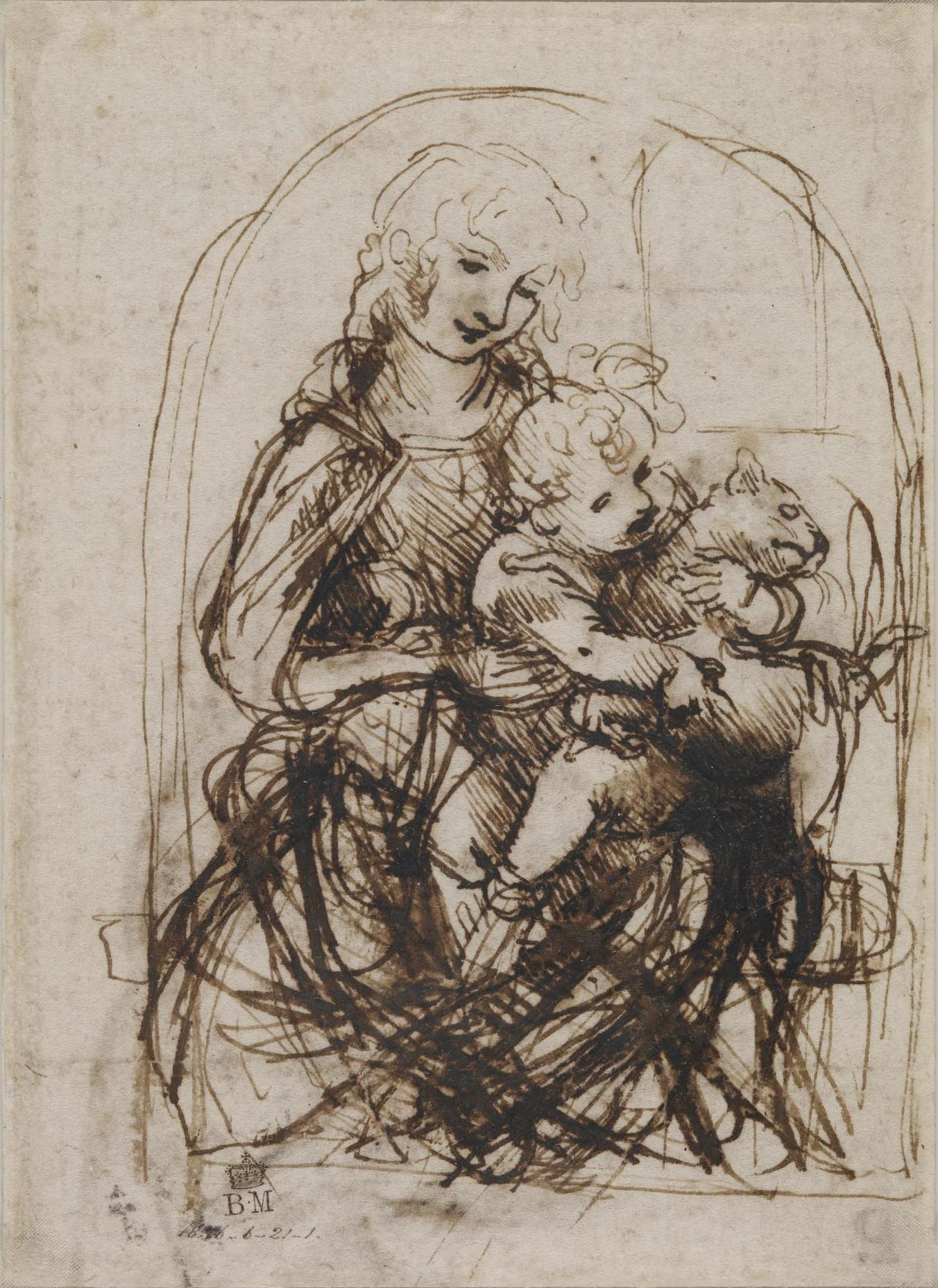
Study for the Madonna of the Cat, British Museum (recto)

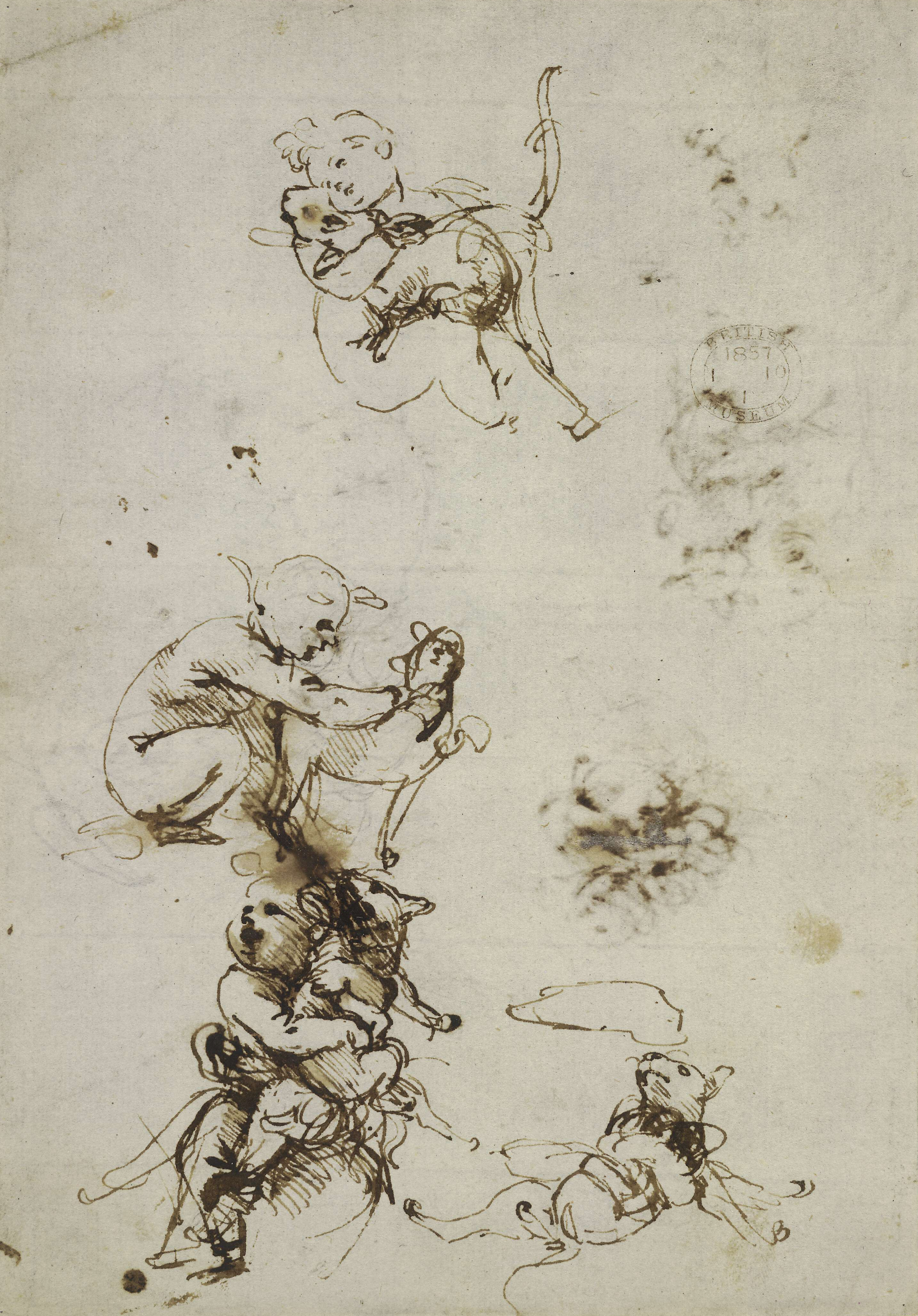
Study for Child with Cat, British Museum

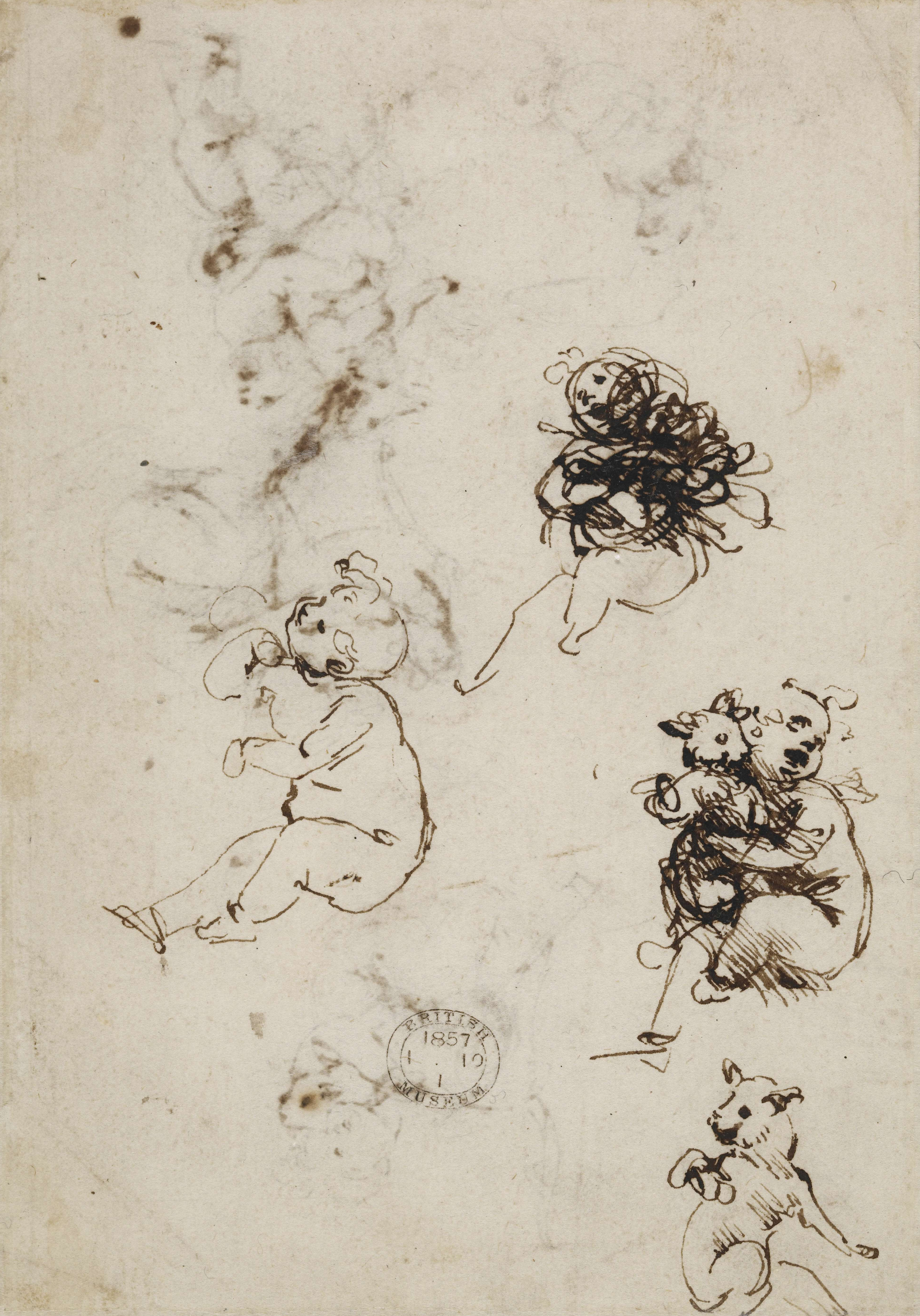
Study for Child with Cat, British Museum

== See also ==
- Marian art in the Catholic Church
- List of works by Leonardo da Vinci
