= Ernst Friedrich von Liphart =

Russian painter (1847–1932)

Baron Ernst Friedrich von Liphart
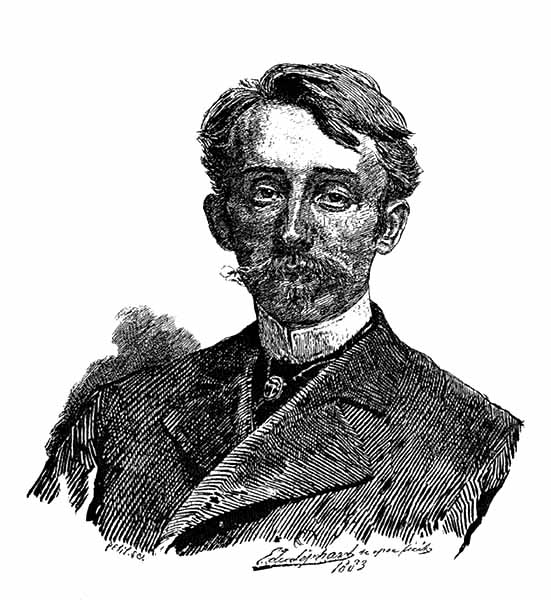
- Self-portrait, 1883
- Born: August 26, 1847; Kambja Parish, Russian Empire
- Died: April 14, 1932 (aged 84); Leningrad, Soviet Union
- Resting place: Smolensky Lutheran Cemetery, St. Petersburg (grave lost)
- Education: Member Academy of Arts (1893); Full Member Academy of Arts (1902)
- Spouse: Louise Jouanne (m. 1884; died 1931)
- Children: 4

Baron Ernst Friedrich von Liphart (August 26, 1847 – April 14, 1932), also known by his Russian name Ernst Karlovich Lipgart, (Note: Russian: Эрнст Карлович Липгарт) and also referred to in English as Earnest Lipgart, was a painter, a noted art expert and art collector from what is now Tartu in Estonia. After living for a time in Florence, he moved to France and then to Russia, where he was a curator at the Hermitage Museum.

== Life ==
Liphart was born in Kambja Parish in Tartu County in 1847. His father, Karl Eduard von Liphart, came from a noble Baltic German family that was based at Raadi Manor in what is now Estonia. His family were members of the national intelligentsia and owned a significant art collection.

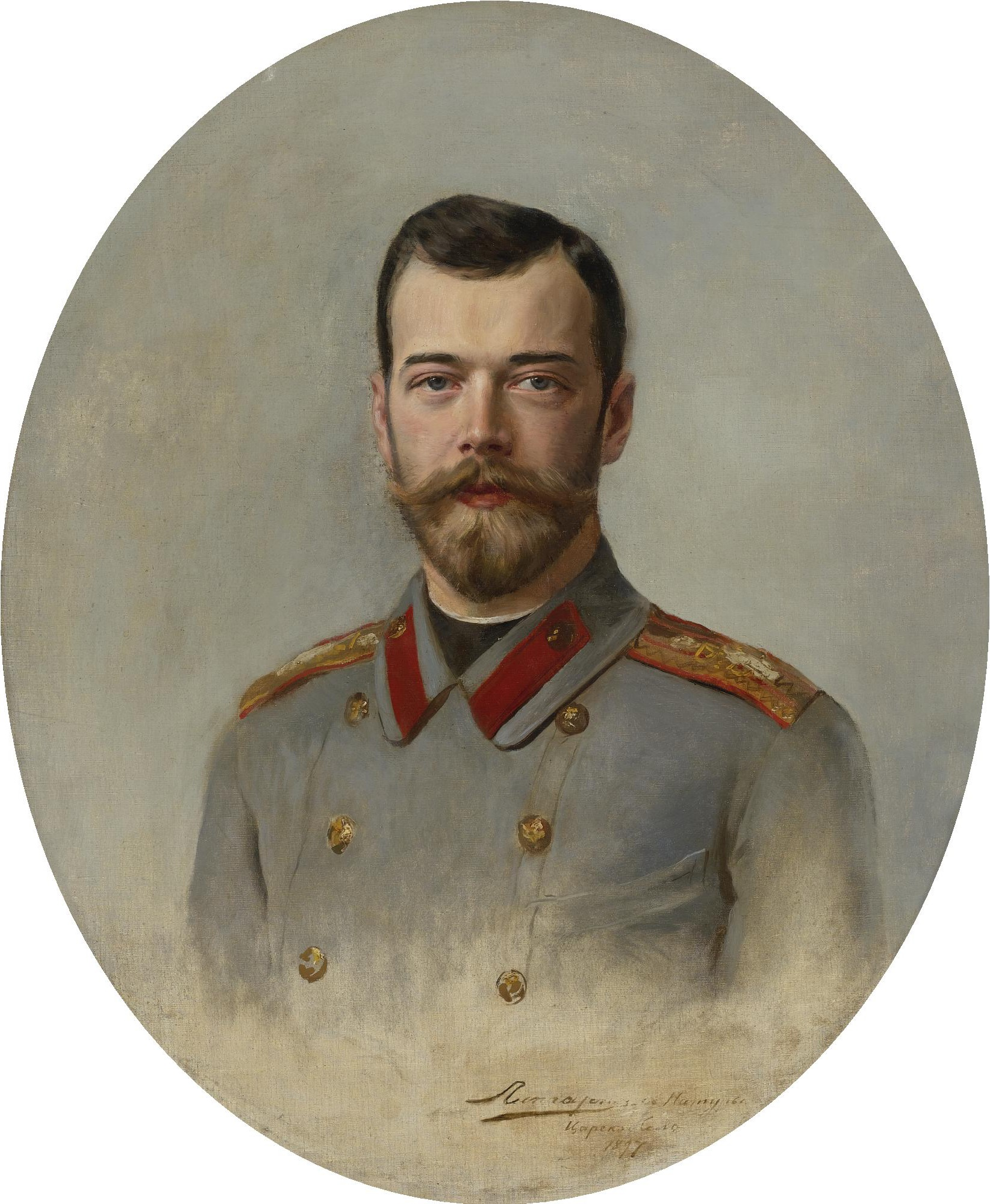
Nicholas II of Russia, 1897, oil on canvas, 78 by 65 cm in oval; sold at Sotheby's in April 2008

== Travels in Spain and Italy ==
Liphart accompanied his father on his travels, starting in 1860. In 1862, they moved to Florence because of Liphart's weak health. His father continued his interest in art, which was financed and supported by Grand Duchess Maria Nikolaevna, the daughter of Tsar Nicholas I. Ernst studied painting under Franz von Lenbach before travelling to Spain with him to study paintings from 1866 to 1868. This trip was funded by Lenbach's patron Count Schack.

== Paris ==
Liphart was disinherited by his father in 1873 after he converted to Roman Catholicism to marry Luisa Juan, a Florentine, before they moved to Paris. He studied under Gustave Boulanger and Jules Joseph Lefebvre at the Académie Julian whilst illustrating the leading magazines La vie élégante and La vie moderne.

== Saint Petersburg ==
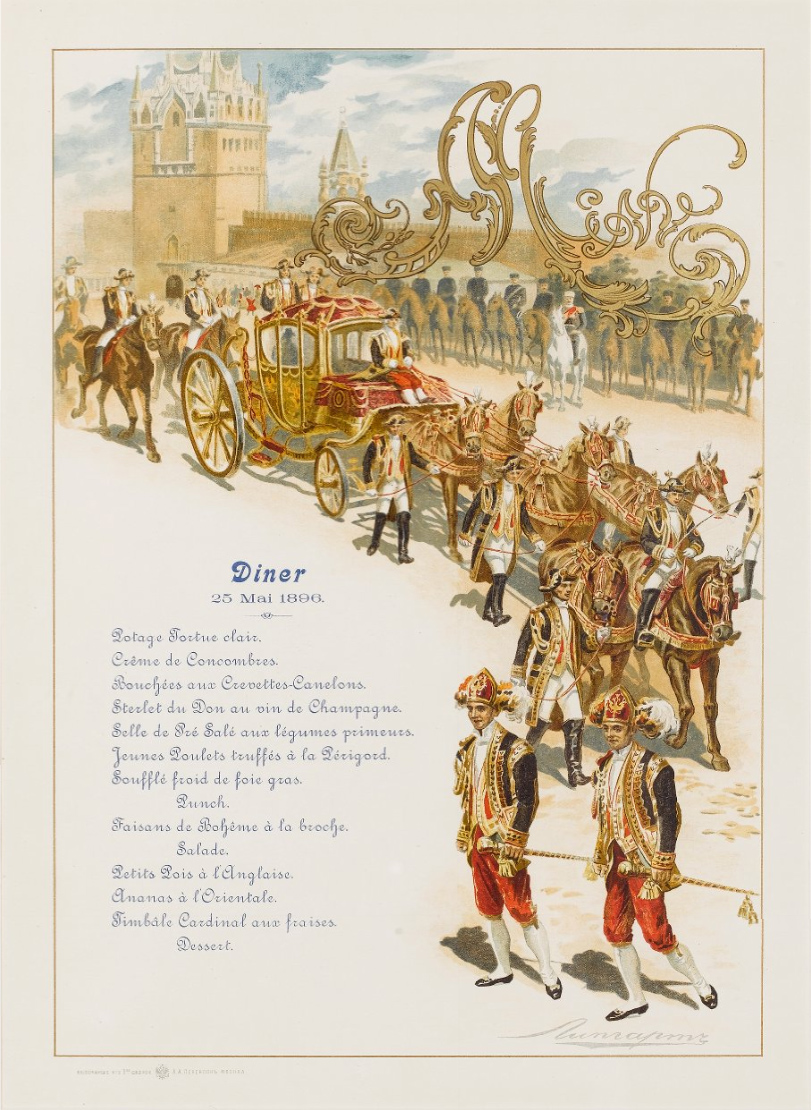
Menu for Nicholas II's coronation by Lipgart

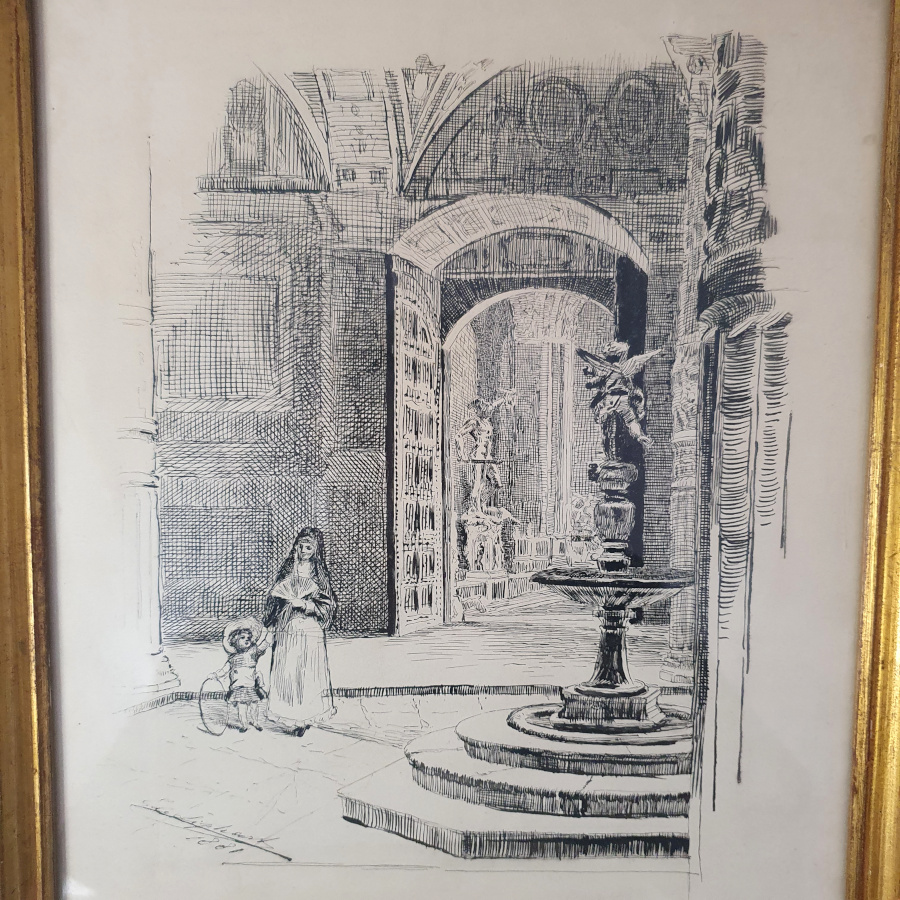
Memory of Florence, 1881 ink drawing dedicated to Mademoiselle Bartet (Julia Bartet 1854-1951)

In 1886 Liphart moved to Saint Petersburg, where he was a successful artist, painting a portrait of Tsar Nicholas II, as well as decorating the curtain and ceiling of the theatre of the Moika Palace and several imperial palaces. Liphart also took on more unusual requests, including the menu for the Tsar's coronation in 1896 and then painting 100 figures on a piano, telling the story of Orpheus. The piano was a present from the Tsar to Empress Alexandra Feodorovna.

Ernst's father died in Florence in 1904. After his death his art collection was moved back to Estonia, where it was combined with his family's collection at Raadi Manor. Liphart's home was still in Russia, where he taught at the Drawing School of the Imperial Society for the Encouragement of the Arts in Saint Petersburg in the 1890s, where his students included Eugene Lanceray. under Jan Ciągliński and Liphart.

Liphart was appointed to several Russian learned societies and he became the curator of paintings at the Hermitage Museum in 1906. He held the position until 1929. Liphart continued his father's interest in Leonardo da Vinci. Liphart arranged for the museum to purchase Madonna and Child with Flowers, which he had correctly attributed to da Vinci, from the Benois family. Liphart also notably identified the painting Saint Peter and Saint Paul to be by El Greco.

The Liphart art collection that had been at the family residence was moved after the Russian Revolution. The collection appeared first in a sale in Copenhagen in 1920. Raadi Manor was used by the Estonian National Museum in 1922–1924 after the manor came under the management of the University of Tartu. The graphic art collection created by the Liphart family came into the possession of Tartu University in the 1920s. The university's art museum still has the collection, which includes examples of Japanese woodcuts as well as noted prints by Albrecht Dürer and William Hogarth.

In 1921 he was evicted from his house and his daughter was executed for harbouring a White Army officer. Before he died, Liphart wrote a novel and a play.

== Selected works ==
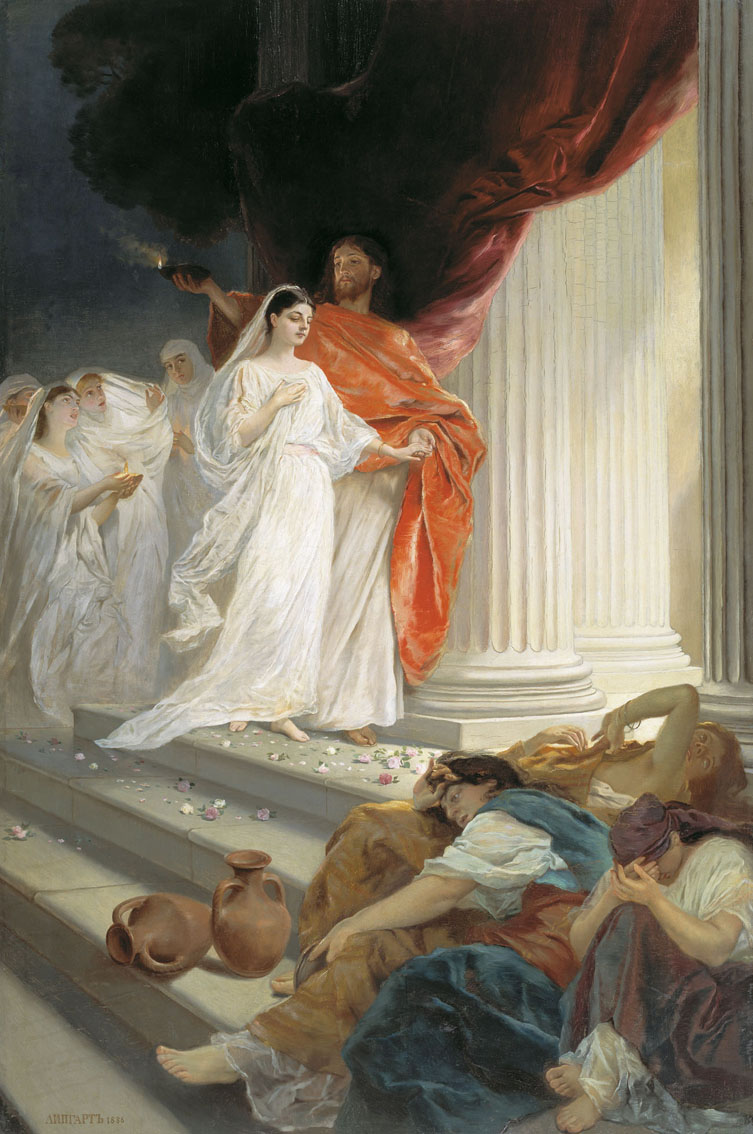
The Parable of the Wise and Foolish Virgins

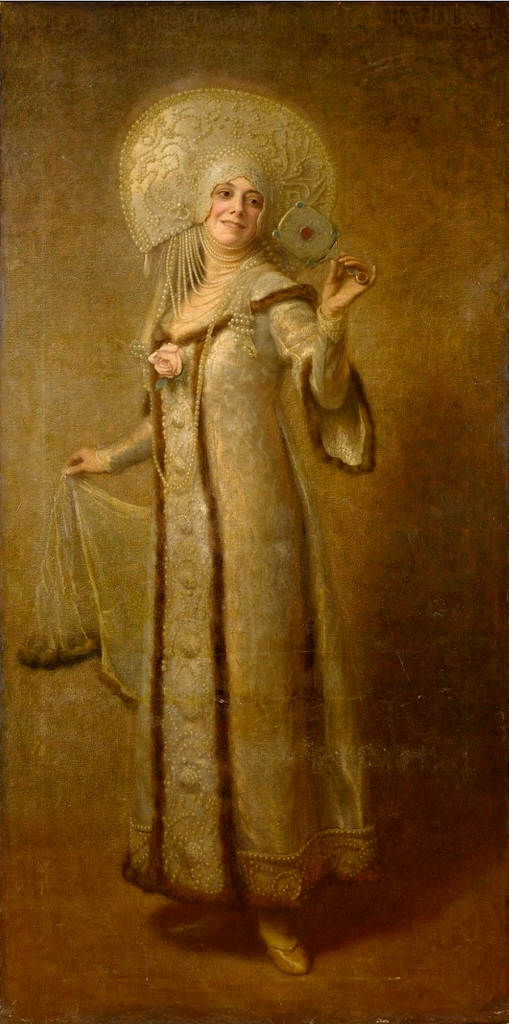
Florence Theleur, Lady Alexander

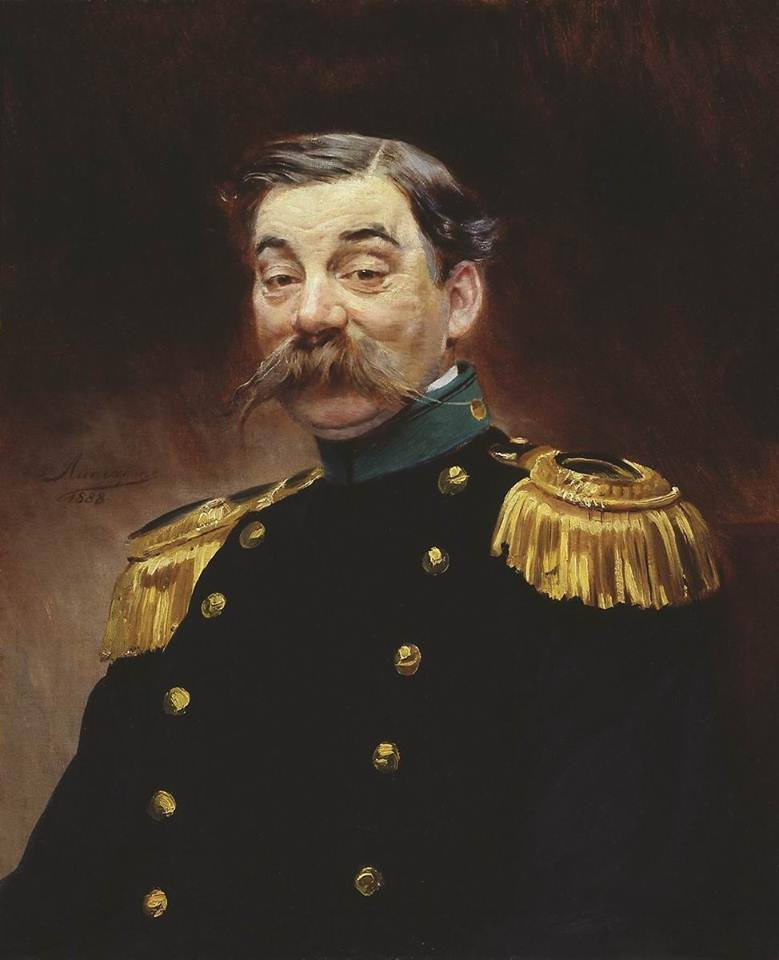
Colonel Alexander Bippen, 1888; Art Museum, Nizhny Novgorod

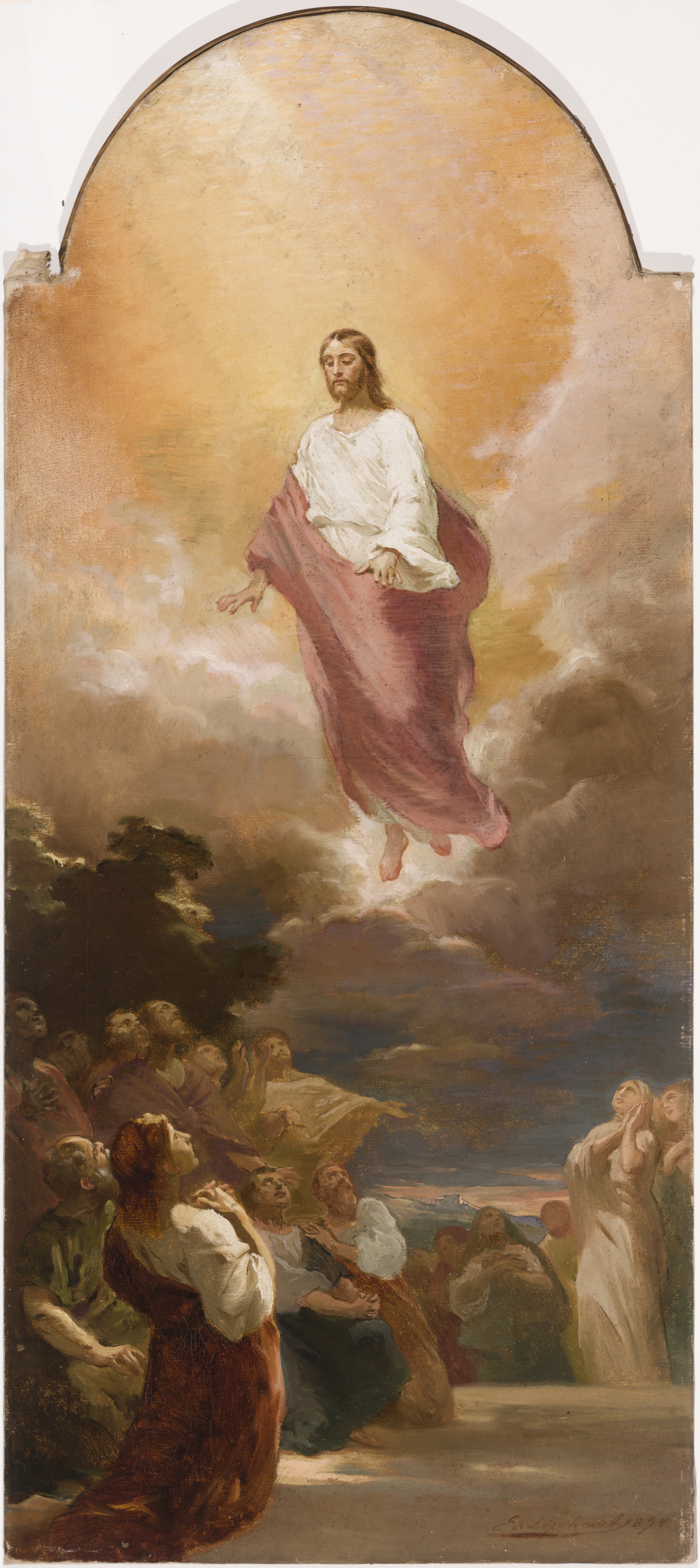
Apotheosis of Christ

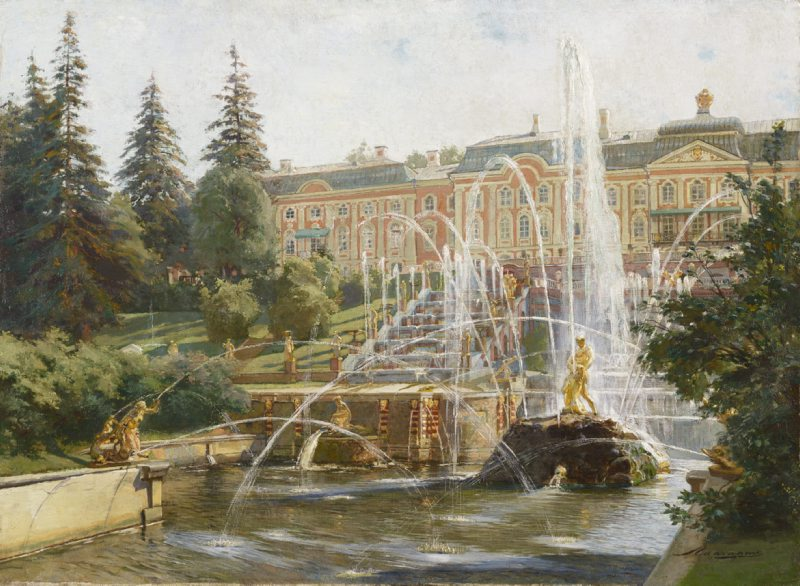
Peterhof Palace

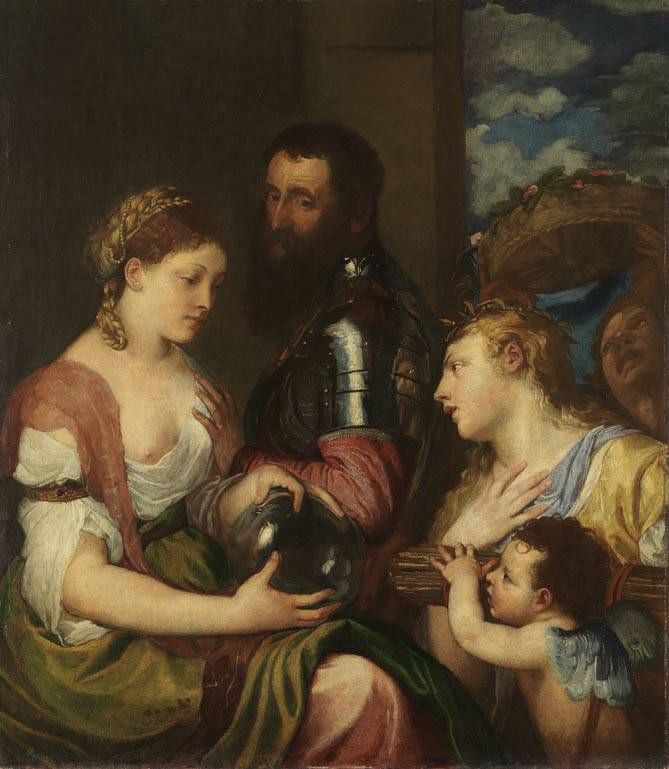
Allegory of Alfonso d'Avalos, Marqués del Vasto

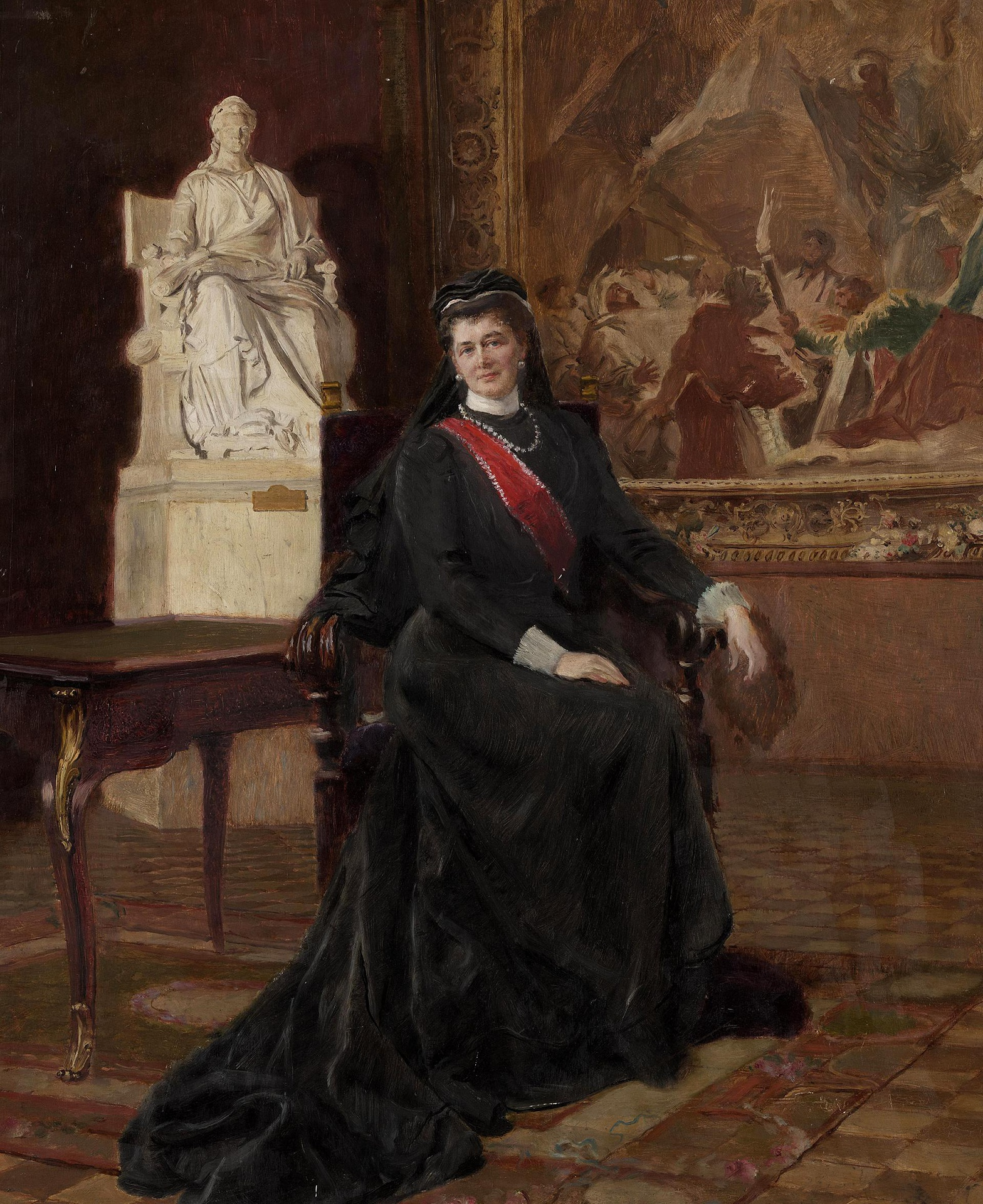
Grand Duchess Maria Pavlovna of Russia as a widow

== Publications ==
- Liphart, Ernst Friedrich von (1928). Леонардо да Винчи и его школа (in Russian). Leningrad: Academy for History of Material Culture, Committee on Promotion of Art Books.
- Liphart, Ernst Friedrich von (2007a). Solomakha, Yelena Yu. (ed.). "Mes memoires. Салон принцессы Матильды". Nashe Naslediye (in Russian). No. 81. Moscow: Nashe Naslediye. pp. 50–71. ISSN 0234-1395.
- Liphart, Ernst Friedrich von (2007b). Solomakha, Yelena Yu. (ed.). "Mes memoires. Художники Салона времён Третьей республики". Nashe Naslediye (in Russian). No. 83–84. Moscow: Nashe Naslediye. pp. 130–145. ISSN 0234-1395.

== Sources ==
- "Липгарт, Эрнст Карлович" . Brockhaus and Efron Encyclopedic Dictionary (in Russian). 1906.
