= Annunciation (Leonardo) =

Painting by Leonardo da Vinci

- Annunciazione (Italian)
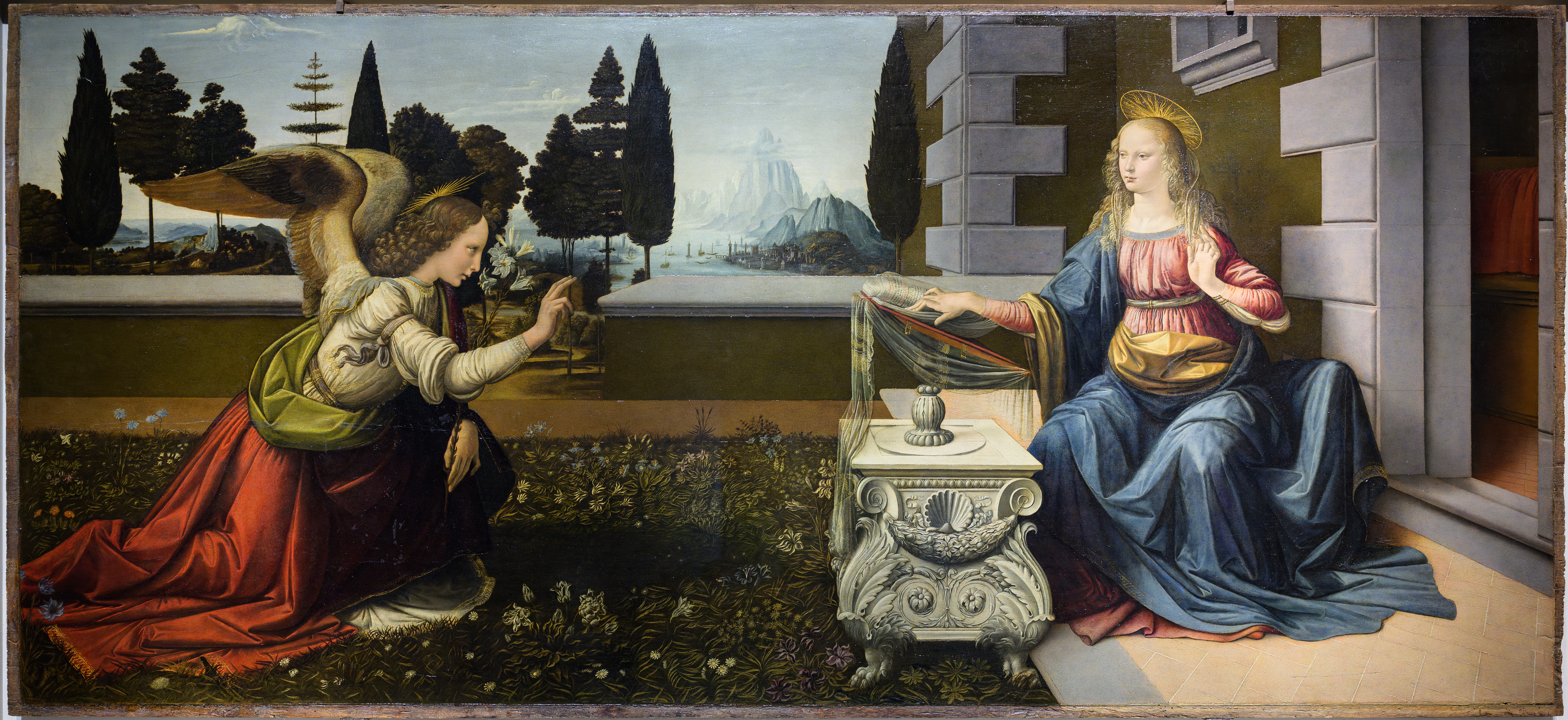
- Artist: Leonardo da Vinci
- Year: c. 1472–1476
- Medium: Oil and tempera on poplar panel
- Subject: The Annunciation
- Dimensions: 98 cm × 217 cm (39 in × 85 in)
- Location: Uffizi, Florence

The Annunciation is a painting by the Italian Renaissance artist Leonardo da Vinci, dated to c. 1472–1476. (Note: Scholars date the painting to 1472–1476: Kemp (2019, p. 6): c. 1473–1474; Marani (2003, p. 338): c. 1472–1475; Syson et al. (2011, p. 15): c. 1472–1476; Zöllner (2019, p. 216): c. 1473–1475) Leonardo's earliest extant major work, it was completed in Florence while he was an apprentice in the studio of Andrea del Verrocchio. The painting was made using oil and tempera on a large poplar panel and depicts the Annunciation, a popular biblical subject in 15th-century Florence. Since 1867 it has been housed in the Uffizi in Florence, the city where it was created. Though the work has been criticized for inaccuracies in its composition, it is among the best-known portrayals of the Annunciation in Christian art.

== Description ==
The subject matter of the work is drawn from Luke 1.26–39. It depicts the angel Gabriel announcing to Mary that she would conceive miraculously and give birth to a son to be named Jesus and called "the Son of God", whose reign would never end. The subject of the annunciation was very popular for contemporaneous artworks painted in Christian countries such as Italy and had been depicted many times in Florentine art, including several examples by the Early Renaissance painter Fra Angelico. Details of the commission for the painting and its early history remain obscure. Since the painting was brought to the Uffizi from the Olivetan monastery San Bartolomeo, scholars have suggested that it might have been the monastery's monks who commissioned the artwork for their sacristy after the church's renovation in 1472.

The marble table in front of Mary probably is derived from the tomb of Piero and Giovanni de' Medici in the Basilica of San Lorenzo, Florence, which Verrocchio had sculpted during this same period. Of great refinement is the semi-transparent veil under the book of the Holy Scriptures that the Virgin is reading, symbol of the prophecies of the Old Testament. The text on which Mary rests her right hand shows Latin alphabetical characters and abbreviations of the Lexicon abbreviaturarum, used by scribes since the Middle Ages, without the sequence of letters written on the page having any meaning: the Virgin, in all probability, seems to be meditating on the shape of the letters according to a mystical mode of spiritual reading. The angel holds a Madonna lily, a symbol of Mary's virginity and of the city of Florence.

It is presumed that, being a keen observer of nature, Leonardo painted the wings of the angel to resemble those of a bird in flight, but later, the wings were lengthened dramatically by another artist.

Although this is the earliest known commissioned painting by Leonardo, it has been pointed out that the painting already bears characteristics that are described as demonstrating the signature innovations he introduced in his paintings: sfumato and atmospheric perspective. The architectural features are drawn according to the rules of perspective, with a central vanishing point. There are some anomalies, such as the Virgin's right arm appearing to be extended. This could be a reflection of Leonardo's early research into optics, which takes into consideration a lateral viewpoint - and lowered due to the initial location of the painting over a side altar in a Church.

Leonardo's painting of the Annunciation is distinguishable from conventional portrayals. The scene occurs in an open courtyard with an expansive view of the Tuscan landscape and seascape in the background. He used chiaroscuro to depict the angel Gabriel and the Virgin Mary, employing a modeling technique to soften their forms. Various references in the painting tie together themes of life, death, and rebirth. The Annunciation explores nature, devoting ten attributes to sight: darkness and brightness, substances and color, form and space, remoteness and nearness, and movement and rest.

== Modern history ==
In 1867, the Annunciation, housed at the Olivetan monastery of San Bartolomeo near Florence, was brought to the Uffizi. Initially, it was attributed to Domenico Ghirlandaio, who, like Leonardo, studied in the workshop of Andrea del Verrocchio. However, in 1869, Karl Eduard von Liphart, a prominent figure in the German art community in Florence, specified the painting as a youthful work by Leonardo. This was one of the first earliest representatives of a surviving piece to the young Leonardo. (Note: Although there was hesitation on the part of some art historians who remarked on its Verrocchio-like qualities, and by Giovanni Morelli, who cited the angel's hands in assigning it to Ridolfo, son of Ghirlandaio, the attribution was accepted: David Alan Brown, Leonardo da Vinci: origins of a genius, 1998:169, 170.) Subsequently, a Leonardo drawing at the Christ Church Picture Gallery in Oxford collection was recognized as a preparatory drawing for the angel's sleeve, providing further evidence of the attribution to Leonardo.

== Controversy ==
On March 12, 2007, the painting was at the center of a furor between Italian citizens and the Minister of Culture, who decided to loan the painting for an exhibition in Japan.

The painting has only been moved from the museum three times in history: for exhibitions in Paris and Milan in the 1930s, and safekeeping during the Second World War. Approximately 300 politicians and art experts wrote to Francesco Rutelli, urging him to halt the transfer.

The painting was transported to Tokyo under strict security measures and was displayed in a custom glass and aluminum frame. It was exhibited in the Tokyo National Museum that once showcased another of Leonardo's works in the 1970s: the Mona Lisa.

== Gallery ==
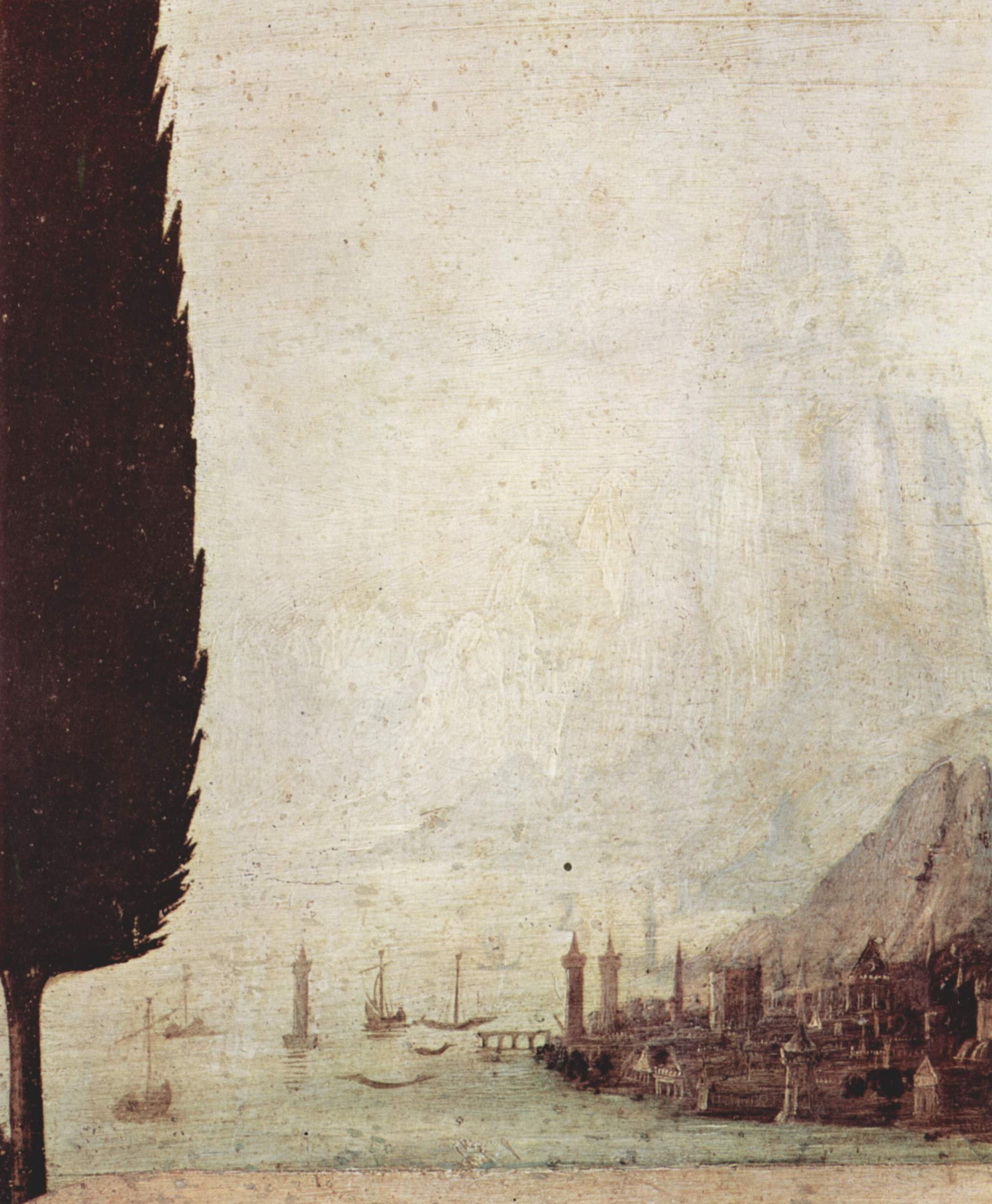
Background

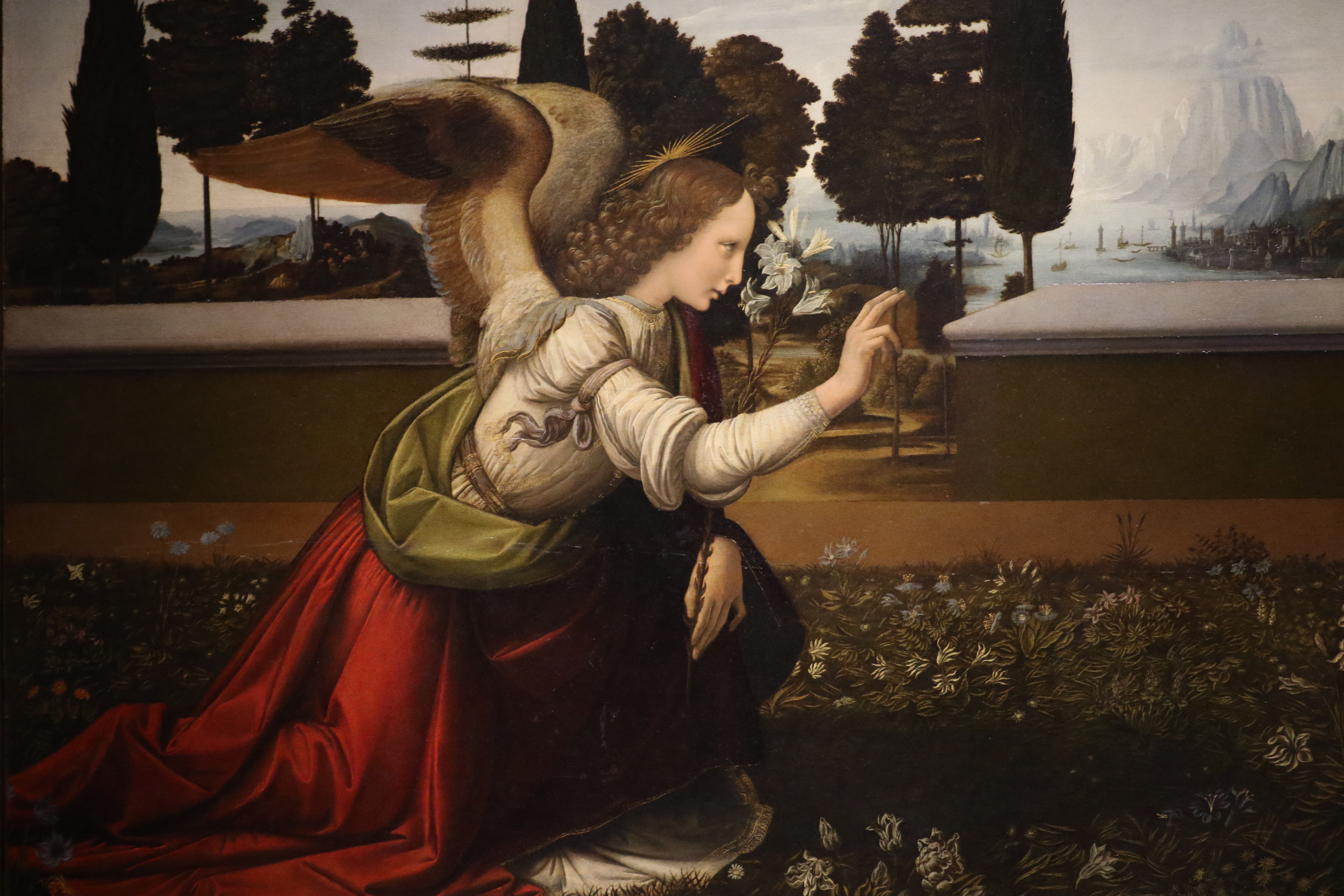
Angel Gabriel

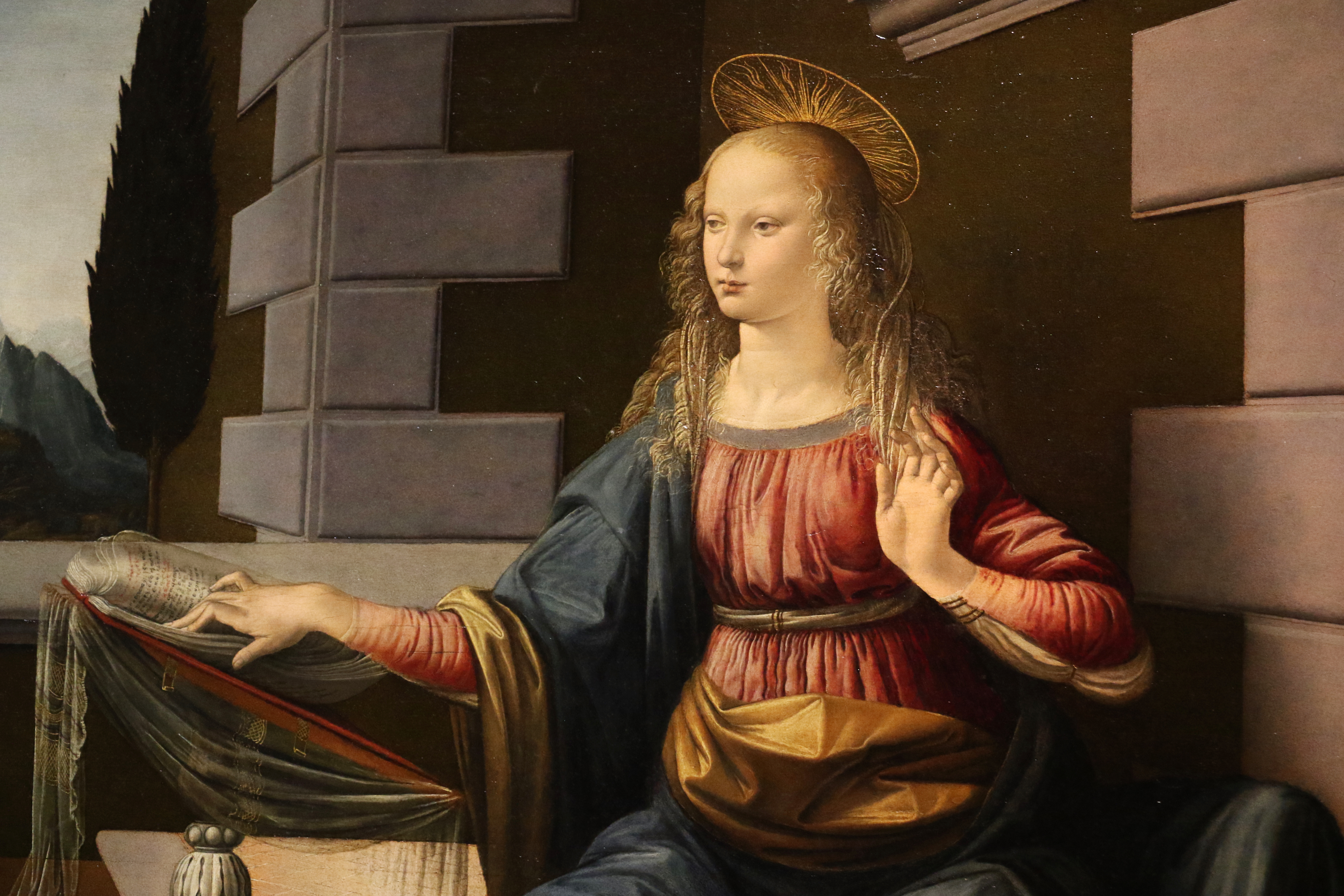
Virgin Mary

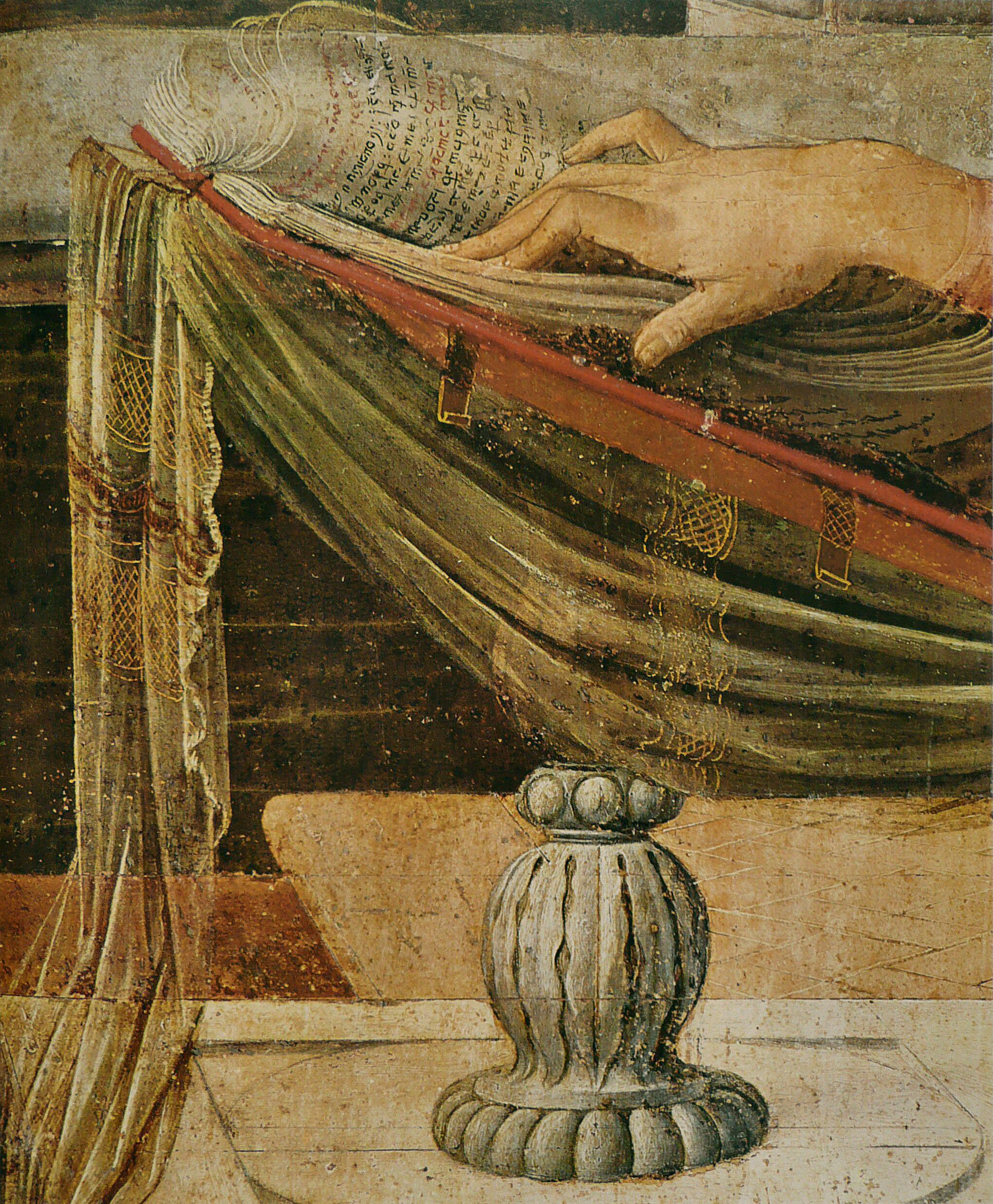
Bible and the Virgin's hand

== See also ==
- List of works by Leonardo da Vinci

== Sources ==
- Kemp, Martin (2019). Leonardo da Vinci: The 100 Milestones. New York: Sterling. ISBN 978-1-4549-304-26.
- Marani, Pietro C. (2003) [2000]. Leonardo da Vinci: The Complete Paintings. New York: Harry N. Abrams. ISBN 978-0-8109-3581-5.
- Syson, Luke; Keith, Larry; Galansino, Arturo; Mazzotta, Antoni; Nethersole, Scott; Rumberg, Per (2011). Leonardo da Vinci: Painter at the Court of Milan. London: National Gallery. ISBN 978-1-85709-491-6.
- Zöllner, Frank (2019) [2003]. Leonardo da Vinci: The Complete Paintings and Drawings (Anniversary ed.). Cologne: Taschen. ISBN 978-3-8365-7625-3.
