= Lake Raadi =

Lake in Estonia

- Raadi järv (Estonian)
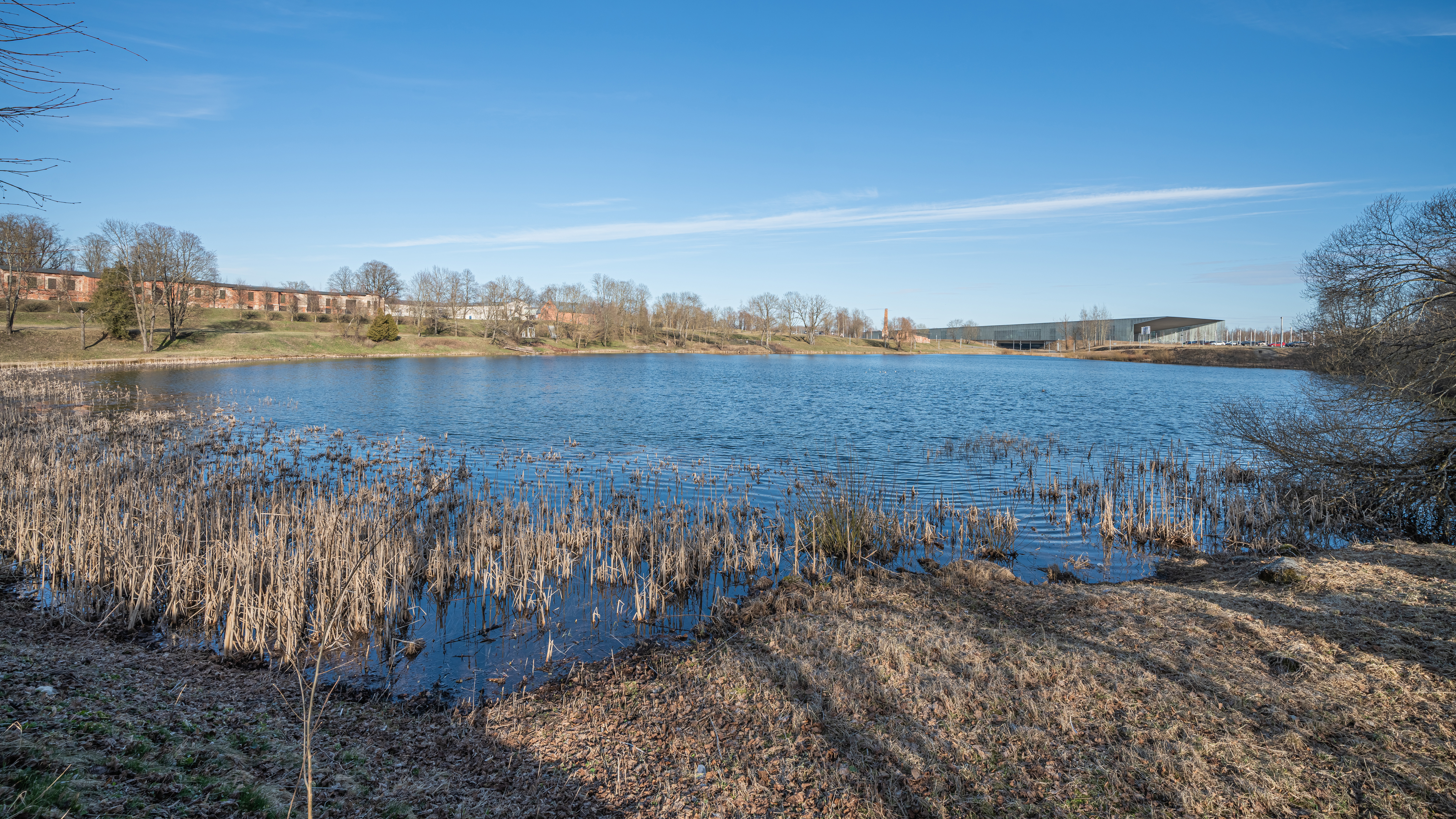

- Location within Estonia
- Coordinates: 58°23′52″N 26°44′24″E
- Basin countries: Estonia
- Max. length: 360 meters (1,180 ft)
- Surface area: 4.5 hectares (11 acres)
- Average depth: 3.4 meters (11 ft)
- Max. depth: 6.3 meters (21 ft)
- Water volume: 163,000 cubic meters (5,800,000 cu ft)
- Shore length^{1}: 900 meters (3,000 ft)
- Surface elevation: 48.5 meters (159 ft)
- ^{1} Shore length is not a well-defined measure.

Lake Raadi (Estonian: Raadi järv or Roodi järv) is a lake in Estonia. It is located on the edge of the city of Tartu.

== Physical description ==
The lake has an area of 4.5 hectares (11 acres). The lake has an average depth of 3.4 meters (11 ft) and a maximum depth of 6.3 meters (21 ft). It is 360 meters (1,180 ft) long, and its shoreline measures 900 meters (3,000 ft). It has a volume of 163,000 cubic meters (5,800,000 cu ft).

== History ==
The lake was part of the grounds of 18th-century Raadi Manor; the grounds are now open to the public. The grounds were designed by the German landscape artist Peter Joseph Lenné. The plans of Raadi Manor Park date back to at least the middle of the 18th century.

== See also ==
- List of lakes of Estonia
