= Karl Eduard von Liphart =

Noted art expert and collector from Estonia

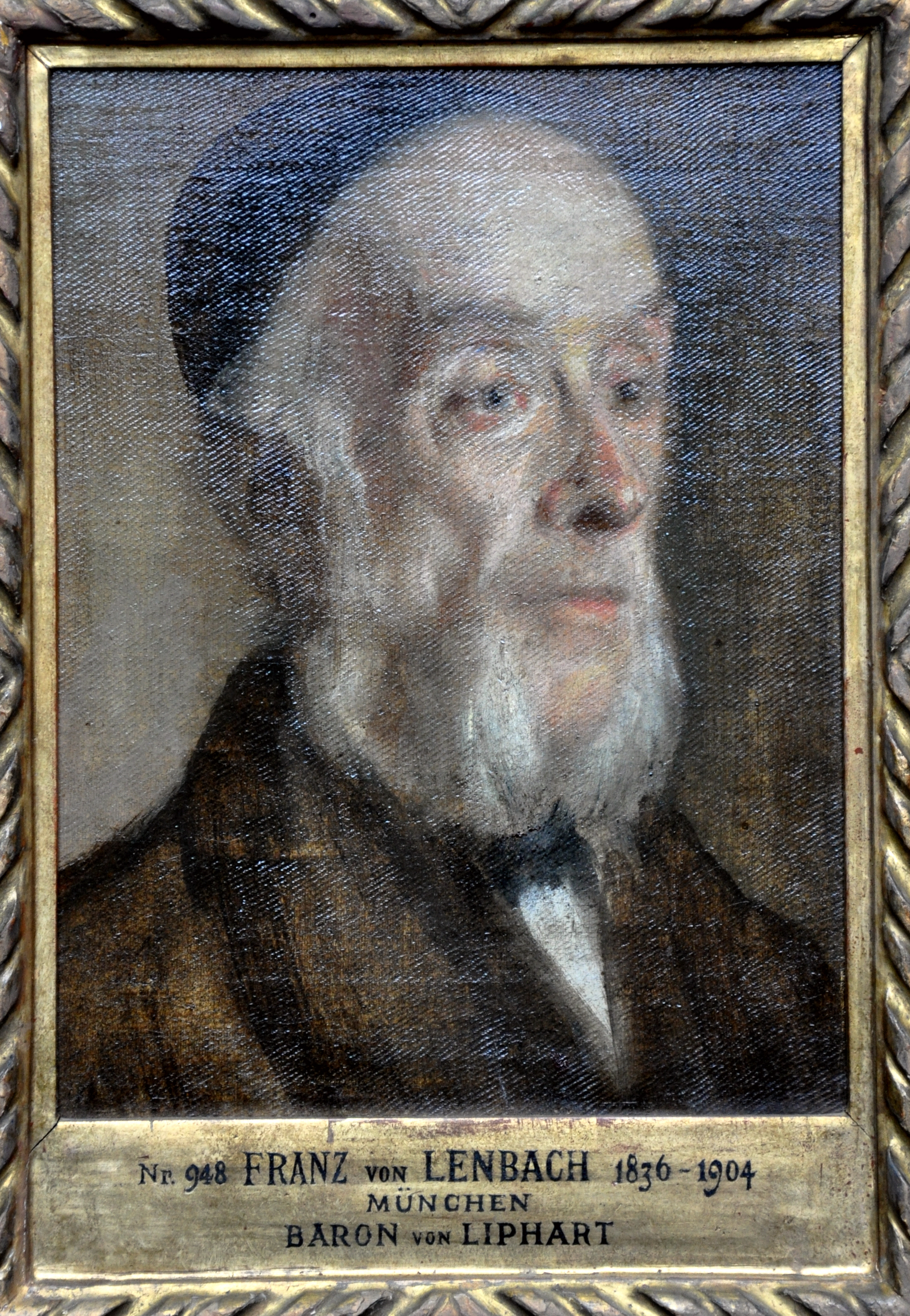
- Portrait by Franz von Lenbach
- Born: 16 May 1808; Kambja Parish, Kreis Dorpat, Governorate of Livonia, Russian Empire
- Died: 15 February 1891 (aged 82); Florence, Italy

Baron Karl Eduard von Liphart or Carl Eduard von Liphart (16 May 1808 – 15 February 1891) was a noted art expert and collector from Estonia. The family manor was near Dorpat (now Tartu).

== Life ==
Liphart was born in Kambja Parish in the Kreis Dorpat of the Russian Governorate of Livonia in 1808. He was one of the three children of Carl Gotthard von Lindhardt and Annette von Loewenwolde. He came from a noble family based at Raadi Manor who were members of the Estonian intelligentsia and owned a significant art collection. Liphart's father maintained his own string quartet led by Ferdinand David, a gifted violinist and composer; David left in 1836 to work in Leipzig with his friend Mendelssohn, but later returned to marry Liphart's sister Sophie.

In 1853 Liphart was the founding President of the Estonian Naturalists' Society. The society still operates (2013) and claims to be the oldest scientific society in the Baltic states.

In 1862 Liphart moved to Florence because of the poor health of his son, Ernst. However, in Florence he was able to add to his expertise and to amass a collection of paintings. He was financed and supported by Grand Duchess Maria Nikolaevna, the daughter of Tsar Nicholas I. The bas-relief of St Jerome by Desiderio da Settignano now in the National Gallery of Art, Washington, was purchased in Florence by an agent of Maria Nikolaevna as a gift for Baron Liphart.

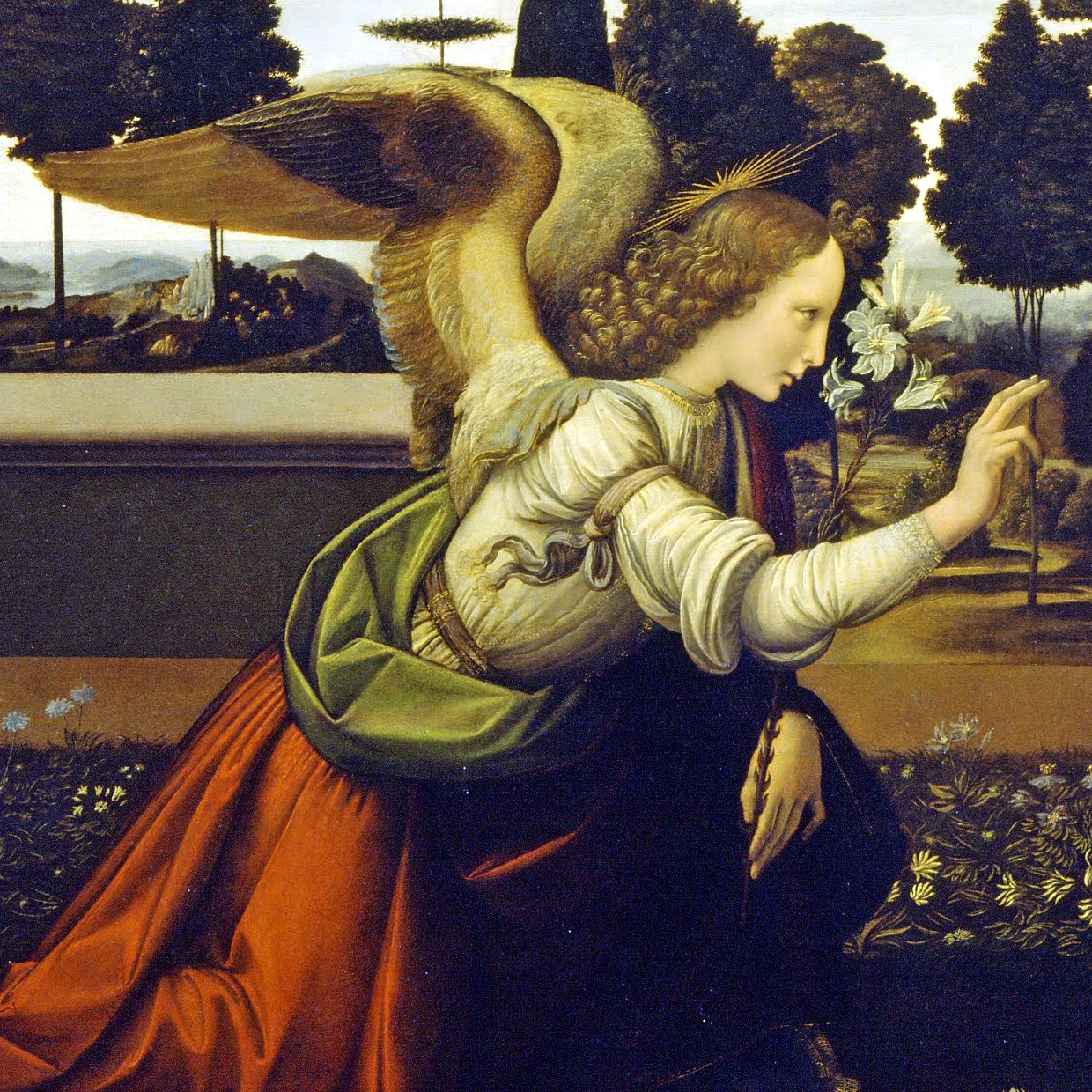
The angel from Leonardo da Vinci's Annunciation

Liphart became an acknowledged expert on the history of art. In 1867, following a theory put forward by Gustav Waagen, Liphart was able to recognise that a painting of the Annunciation newly arrived in the Uffizi Gallery was by Leonardo da Vinci. In 1871 he realised that another painting in the Uffizi was by the seventeenth century artist Hercules Seghers. It was Liphart and his friend the Director of the Berlin State Museums, Wilhelm von Bode, who independently established that this artist was more than just an etcher.

He died in Florence in 1891. After his death his art collection was moved to Estonia where it was combined with his family's collection at Raadi Manor.

Liphart wrote numerous articles and published brief notes, but never published a book-length monograph. He corresponded with all the major art historians of his time, in Europe, Great Britain and the United States.

Liphart's son, Ernst Friedrich von Liphart, was disinherited by his father in 1873 for converting to marry a Roman Catholic. However his son was an accomplished artist, painting portraits including one of Tsar Nicholas II. He went on to be a curator of the Hermitage Museum.

== The art collection ==
The graphic art that was collected by the Liphart family came into the possession of Tartu University in the 1920s. The university still conserves the collection which includes examples of Japanese art as well as noted European printmakers like Albrecht Dürer and William Hogarth.
