= Raadi Manor =

Manor in Tartu, Estonia

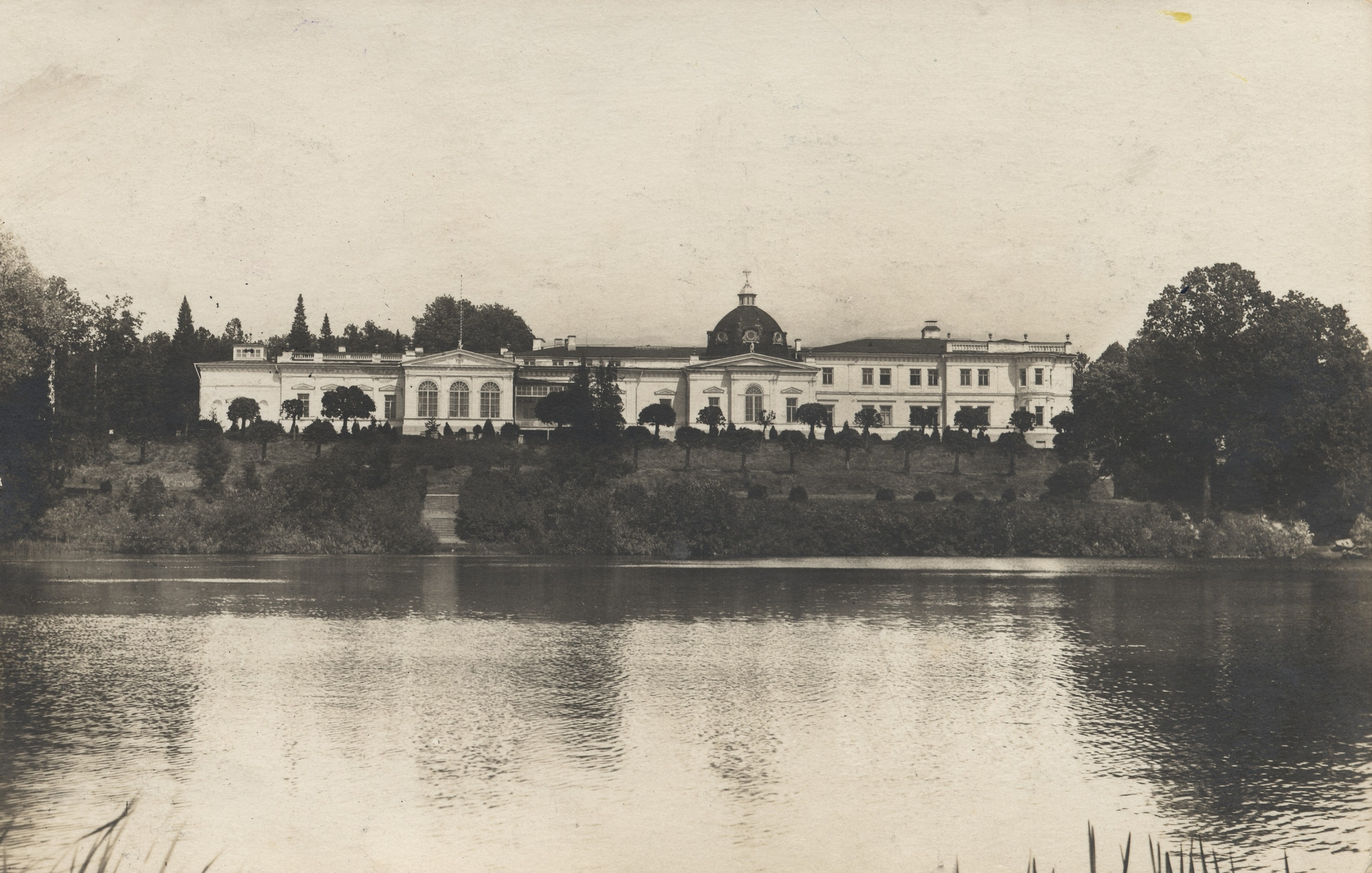
- Raadi Manor in 1927
- Interactive map of the Raadi Manor area

General information
- Location: Raadi Manor Park, Tartu, Estonia
- Coordinates: 58°23′57.26″N 26°44′27.52″E
- Completed: 1783
- Client: Liphart family
- Owner: Estonian National Museum

Drone video of Raadi manor and surroundings in Tartu, Estonia (September 2021)

Raadi Manor was in the area known as Raadi-Kruusamäe, on the outskirts of Tartu in Estonia. The manor and Raadi Manor Park were the home to the Liphart noble family who were significant art collectors. The family moved away and the buildings housed the Estonian National Museum until the manor was destroyed during the Second World War. Part of the grounds became Raadi Airfield which was used as a secret Soviet bomber base for fifty years. Today the park is open and some of the old buildings are in use by the museum.

== History ==
The site of the main manor was established in the Middle Ages. Plans of Raadi Manor Park date back to at least the middle of the 18th century. The grounds were designed by the German landscape architect Peter Joseph Lenné. The manor itself was founded in 1783. The gardens were admired by Maria Fjodorovna who was the second wife of Paul I of Russia.

The golden age of Raadi was when the Liphart family were here. They were a noble family who took an interest in the local intelligentsia and particularly in Art. Karl Eduard von Liphart created a large collection of drawings and graphic art which is still owned by the Estonian National Museum. His son Ernst Friedrich von Liphart moved away from Raadi with his father in 1860. They both lived in Florence from 1862. Father and son were estranged in 1873 and Ernst later moved to Russia where he continued to paint and mix with the Russian nobility.

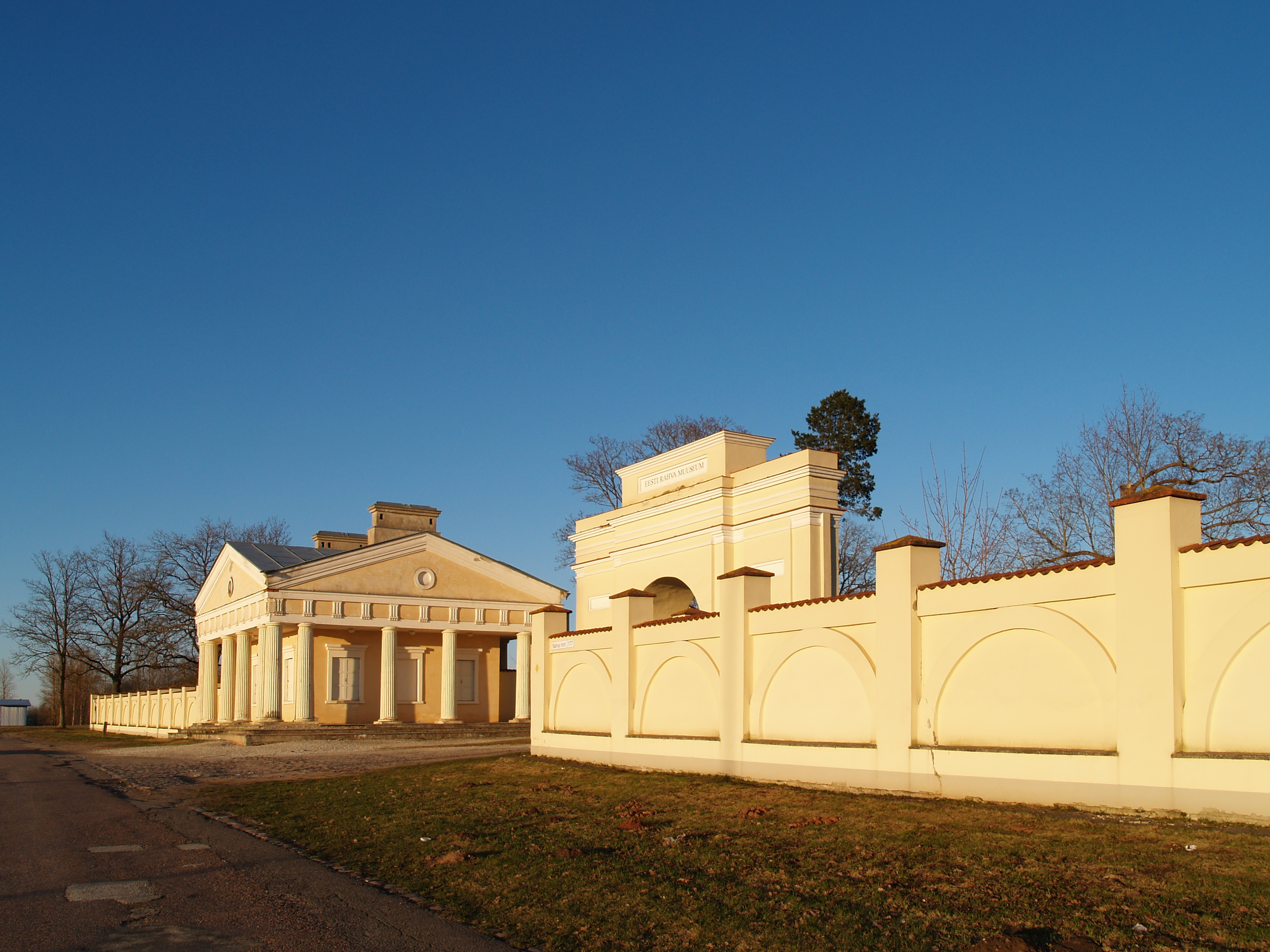
Manor wall and gatehouse

Ernst's father died in Florence in 1904. After his death his art collection was moved back to Estonia where it was combined with his family's collection at Raadi Manor.

The manor was subject to unsympathetic building at the turn of the 20th century. The Liphart family moved away during World War I and the Russian Revolution heralded the start of sales of the more valuable part of the art collection in Copenhagen in 1920.

The manor was obtained by Tartu University. The buildings housed the Estonian National Museum from 1922. This was a bold move as the Liphart family of Baltic German aristocrats were viewed as "ideologically and culturally revolting" by the local Estonians. Despite this the museum was popular and the grounds became a place for leisure.

The manor was destroyed during the Tartu Offensive in 1944 when it caught fire during a bombing raid.

== Airfield ==
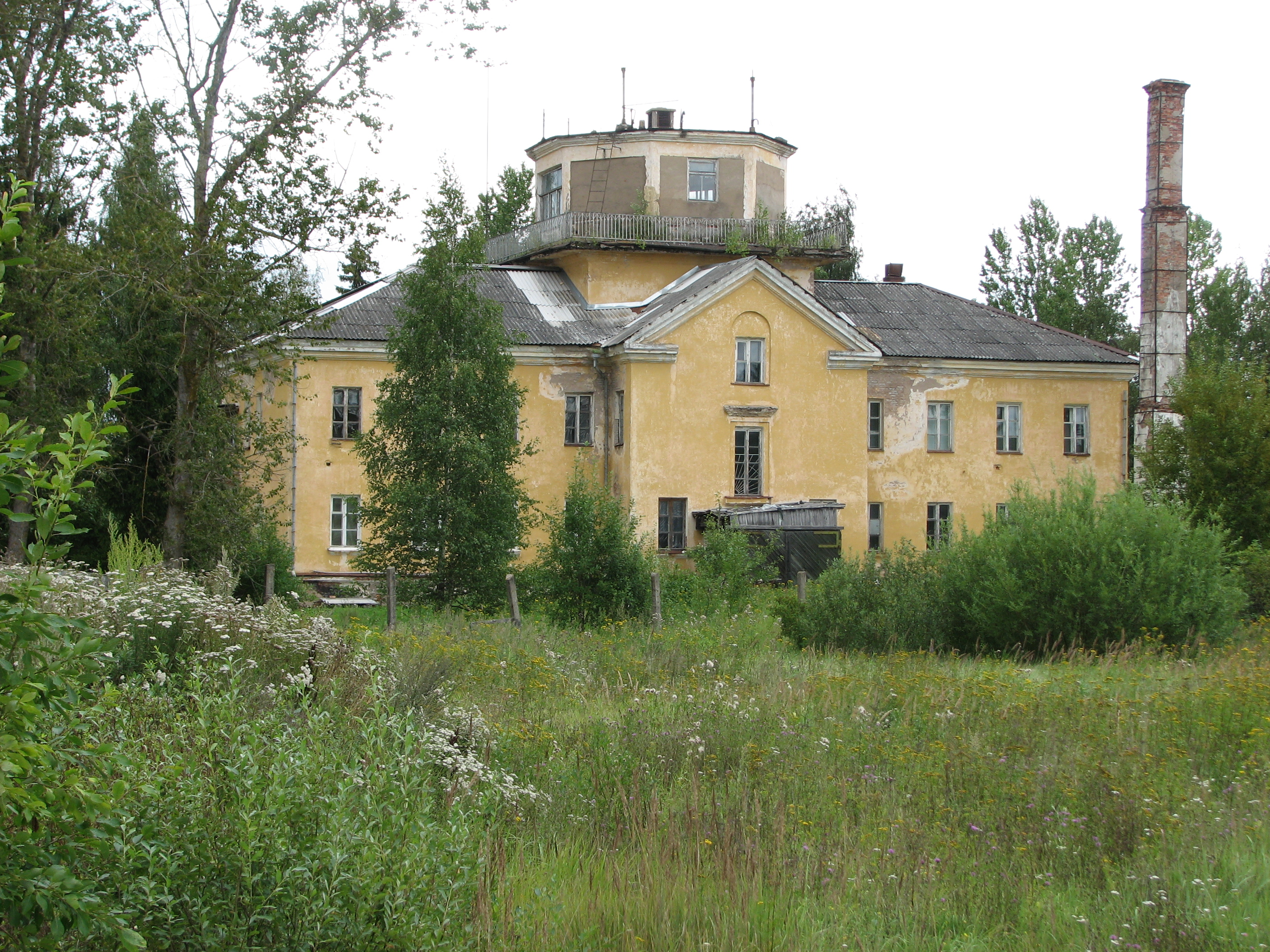
Military airport building in 2008

In 1940 100 ha were requisitioned to create a Soviet airport. The airport became a major Soviet bomber base for fifty years. The secrecy of the airfield meant that foreigners were not allowed to visit the city. Over 100 bombers were based here making it the largest Baltic airfield. This meant that the museum's collection had to be stored in places like the city's churches. The airfield is still seen as a reminder that Estonia was occupied by Soviet forces.

== Today ==
Today the Estonian National Museum has buildings for storage at Raadi and the ice house and gatehouse have been renovated. The museum has plans to build new buildings here and it has organised an architecture competition to identify a winning design. That design choice was made in 2006. The winning single-storey multi-national design will retain the legacy of Raadi Manor's history. The new building will be nearly 34,000 square metres and will incorporate the museum, conference facilities and a cinema. The building may start before 2015.

The park is currently open to the public.
