= Raadi Airfield =

Former military airfield in Estonia

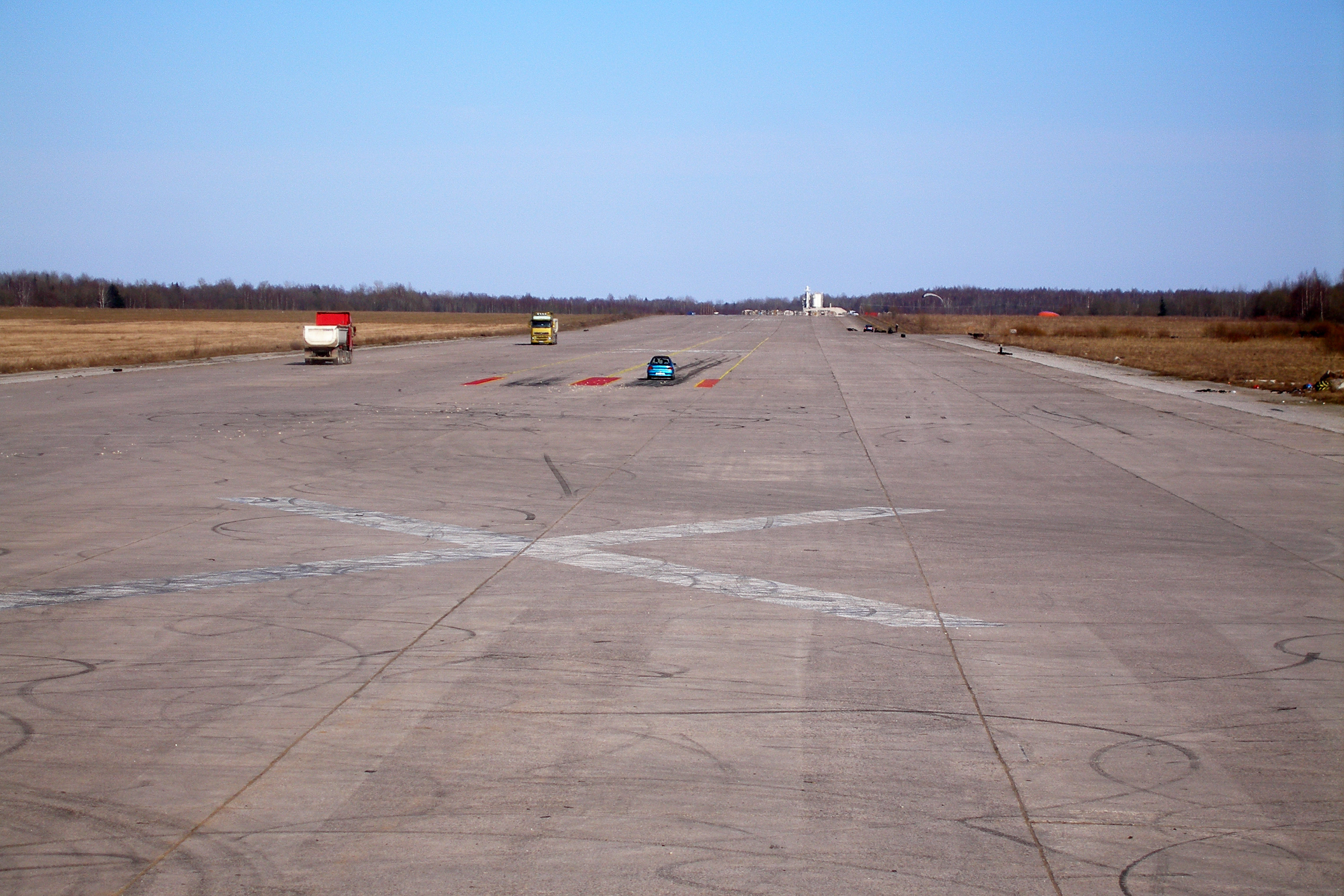
- Main runway in 2009
- IATA: none; ICAO: ~~EETR~~

Summary
- Airport type: ~~Military~~
- Operator: ~~Soviet Air Forces~~
- Location: Raadi, Tartu County, Estonia
- Elevation AMSL: 223 ft (68 m)
- Coordinates: 58°24′17″N 026°46′25″E

Map
- Location within Estonia

Runways
Direction	Length		Surface
Direction	m	ft	Surface
~~09/27~~	~~3,000~~	~~9,842~~	~~Concrete~~
- Sources: Forgotten Airports

Raadi Airfield (Tartu Air Base) ~~(ICAO: EETR)~~ is a former air base in Estonia located in Raadi, 4 km (2.5 mi) northeast of Tartu. The land once belonged to Raadi Manor and is now the new site of the Estonian National Museum.

== History ==
In 1940 100 hectares (250 acres) were requisitioned from the Raadi Manor estates to create a Soviet military airbase. The airfield was fought over during the Second World War and the manor house was burnt during the Tartu Offensive.

The airport became a major Soviet Long Range Aviation bomber base for fifty years. The secrecy of the airfield meant that foreigners were not allowed to visit the city. Dozens of bombers were based here, making it the largest Baltic airfield. The airfield is still seen as a reminder that Estonia was occupied by Soviet forces.

It was a fairly extensive base with 24 large revetments and over 30 small ones. This airfield was listed as No. 13 in USSR airfield priority, by the US in 1956. Meaning it was the only nuclear target in the Baltics at this time. It was home to the Soviet 132nd Heavy Bomber Aviation Regiment (132 TBAP), and the 326th Heavy Bomber Aviation Division which flew Tupolev Tu-16 and Tupolev Tu-22M aircraft. It was also a transport base with the 192 and/or 196 Military Transport Aviation Regiments (VTAPs) flying Ilyushin Il-76M cargo aircraft until 1990. These aircraft were relocated to Tver.

On 15 January 1991, a Soviet Air Force Tu-16K Badger crashed near Tartu Air Base, on landing when the undercarriage failed to extend. The pilot and co-pilot ejected, but the four crew members were killed.

In 1992 the 132nd Heavy Bomber Aviation Regiment moved to Vozdvizhenka in the Russian Far East.

== Today ==
By 1993 it was listed as a designated emergency airfield on a Jeppesen chart for airline use although this is no longer possible as the runway has various used car lots preventing use by aircraft. On 16 January 2006 the winning works of the international architecture competition held to design the new Estonian National Museum building were revealed. In 2016, the museum was opened.

== Gallery ==
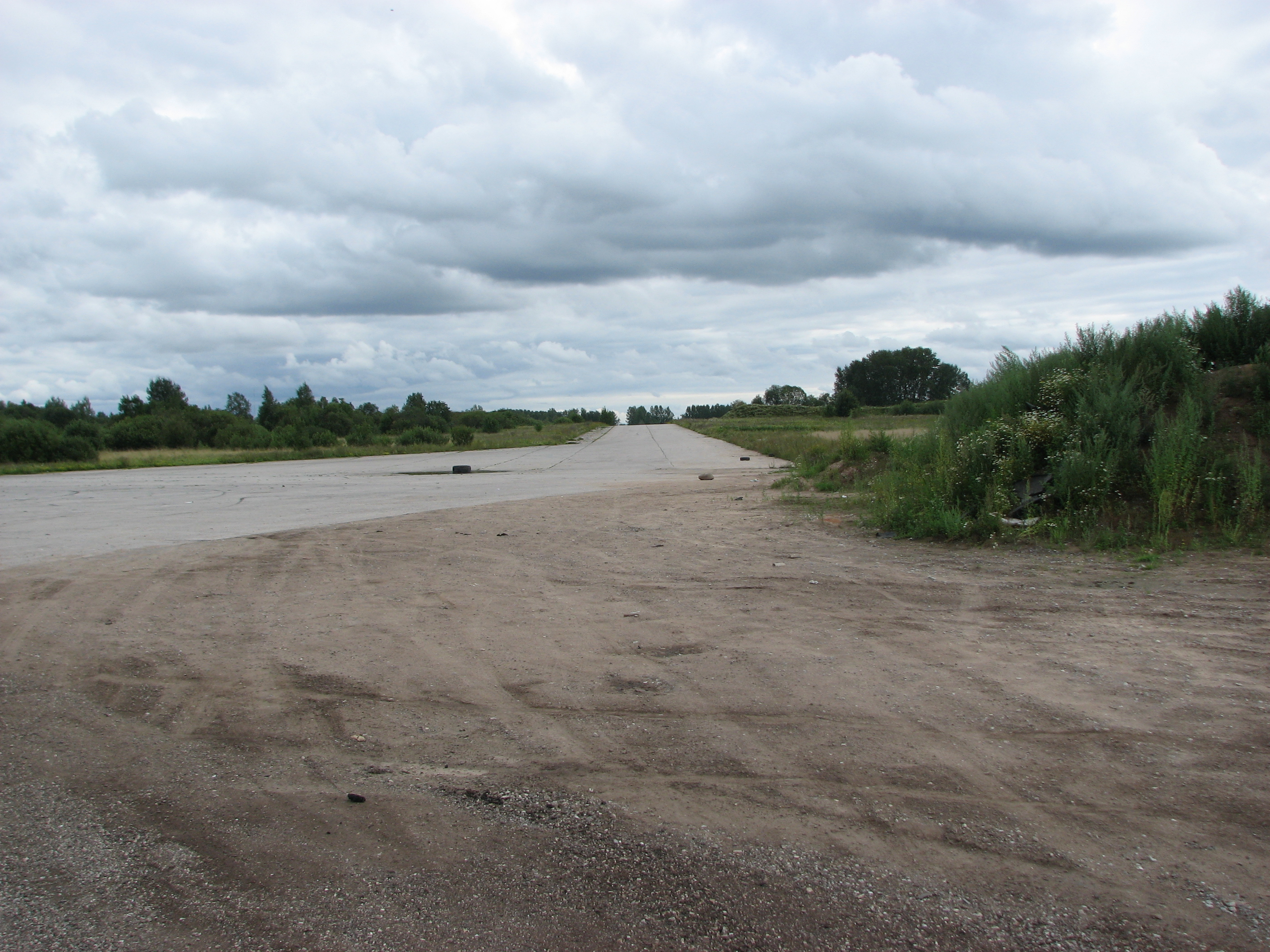

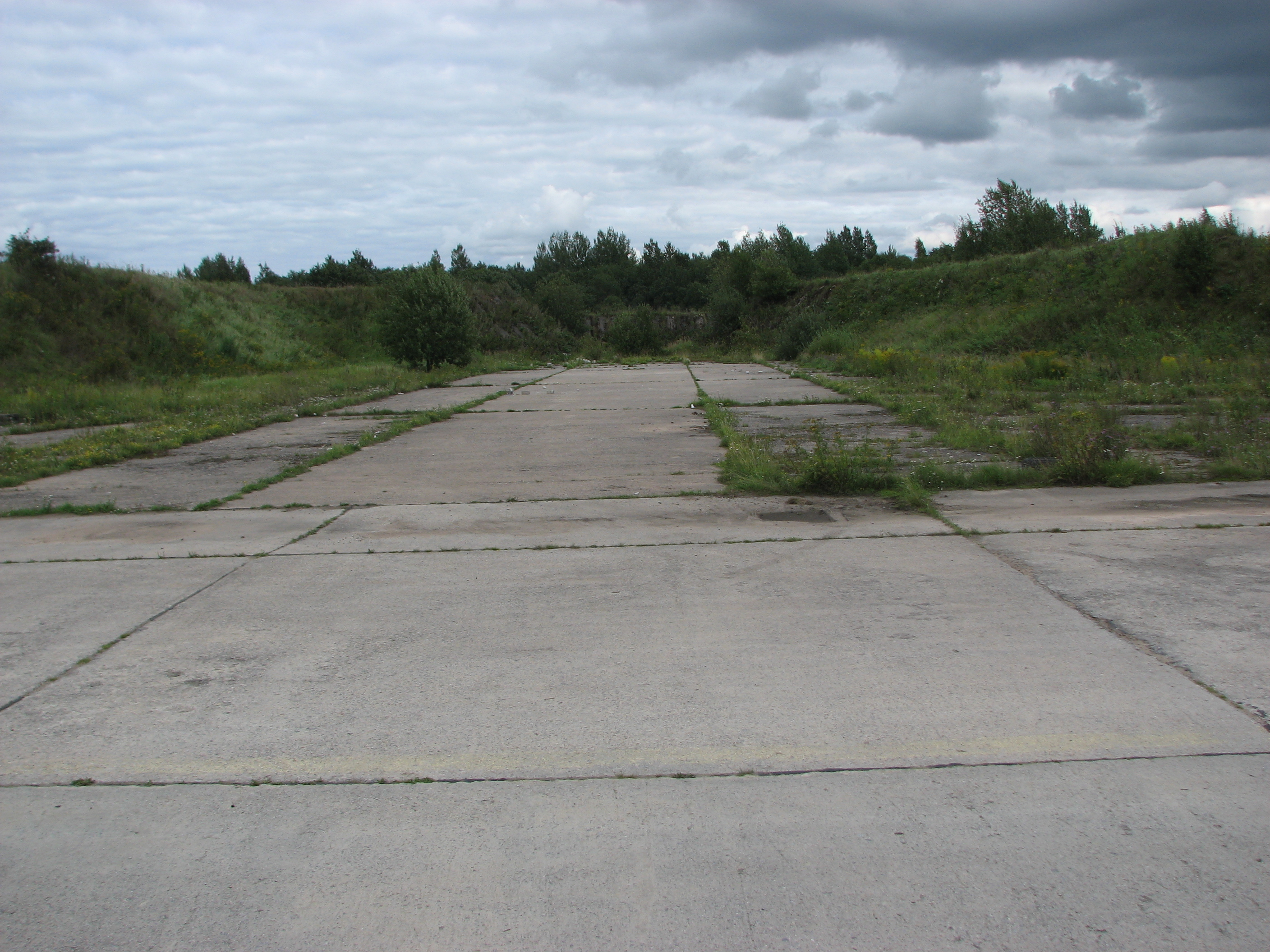

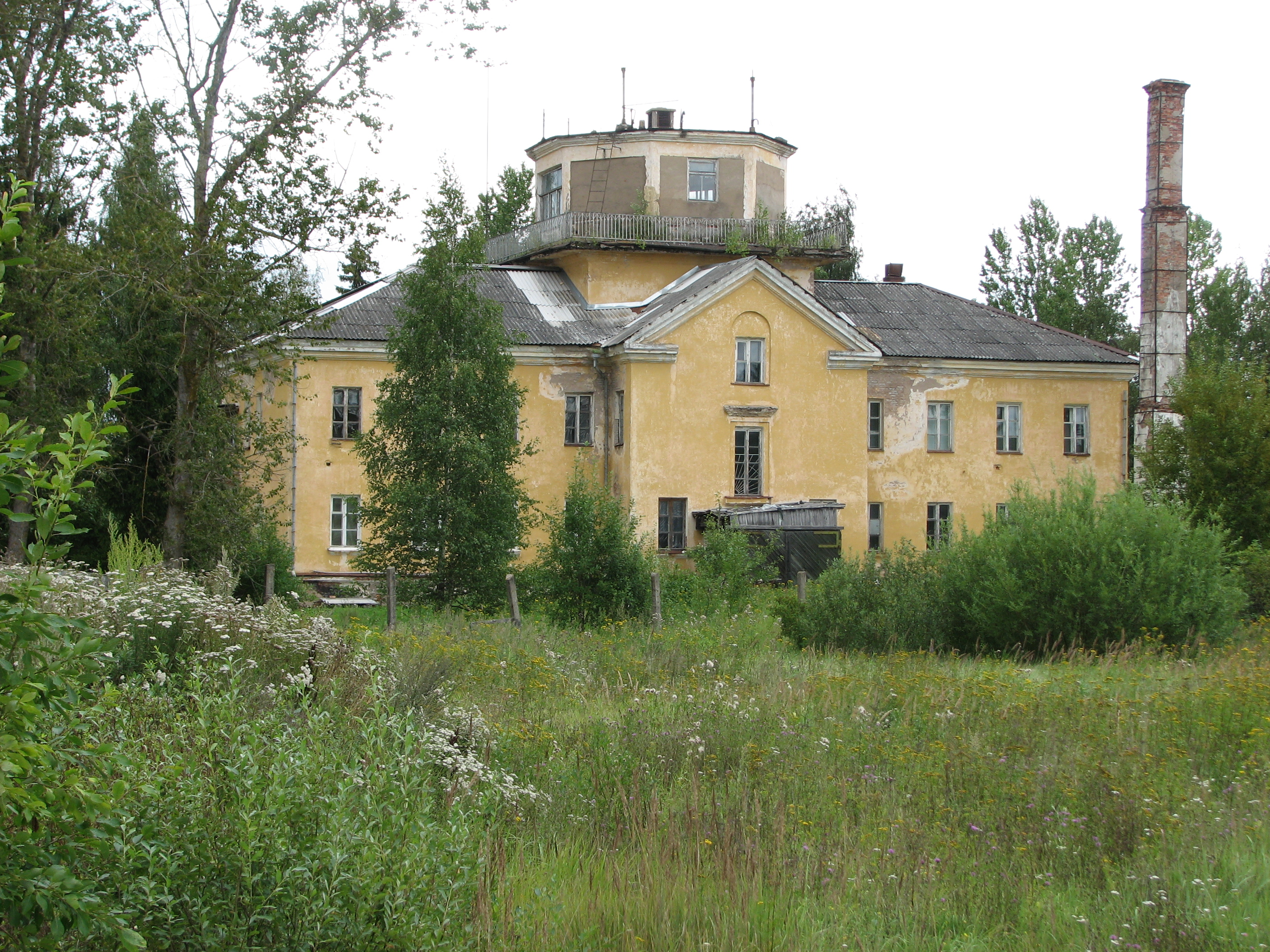

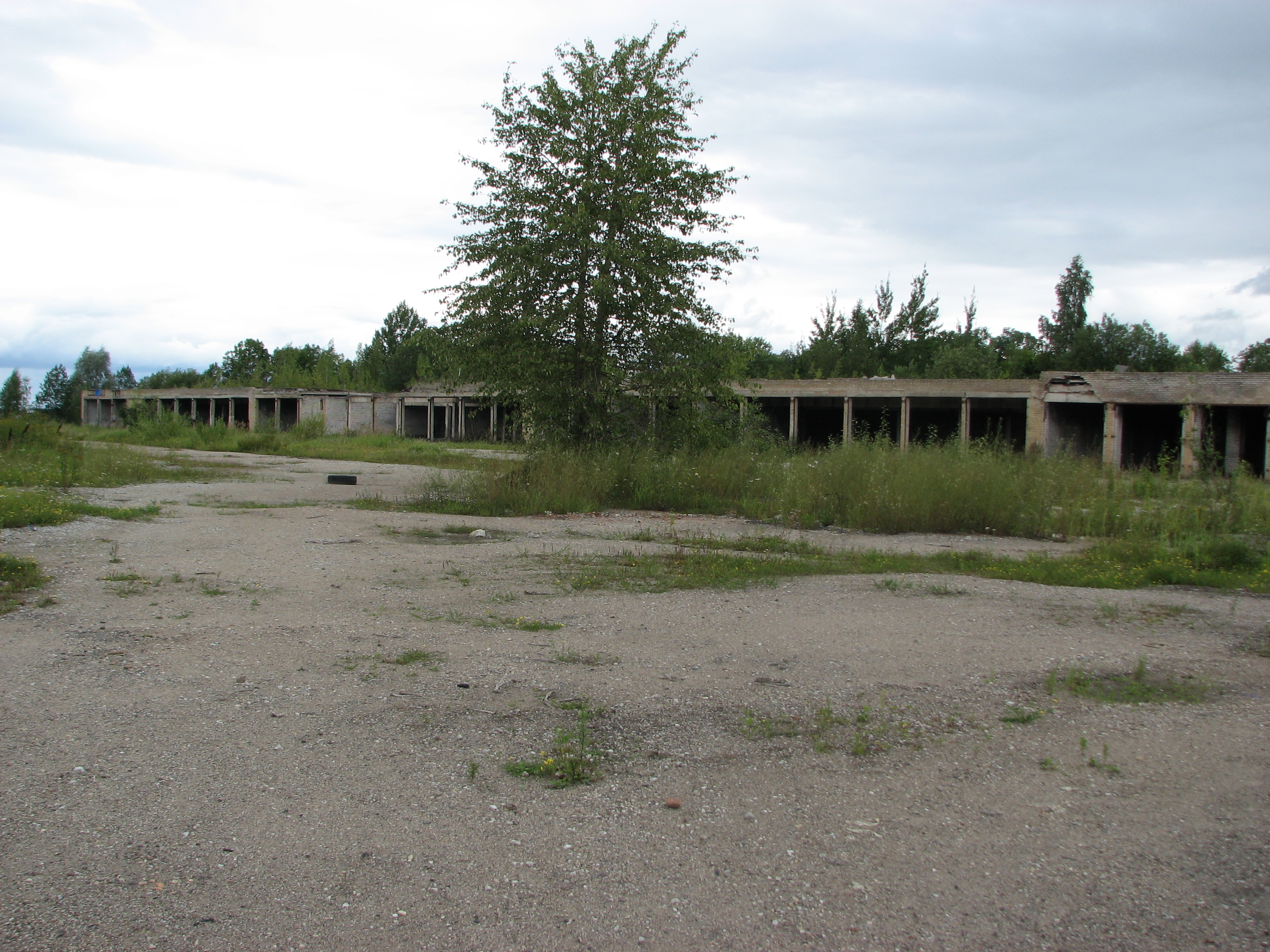
