= List of self-portraits in the Uffizi Gallery =

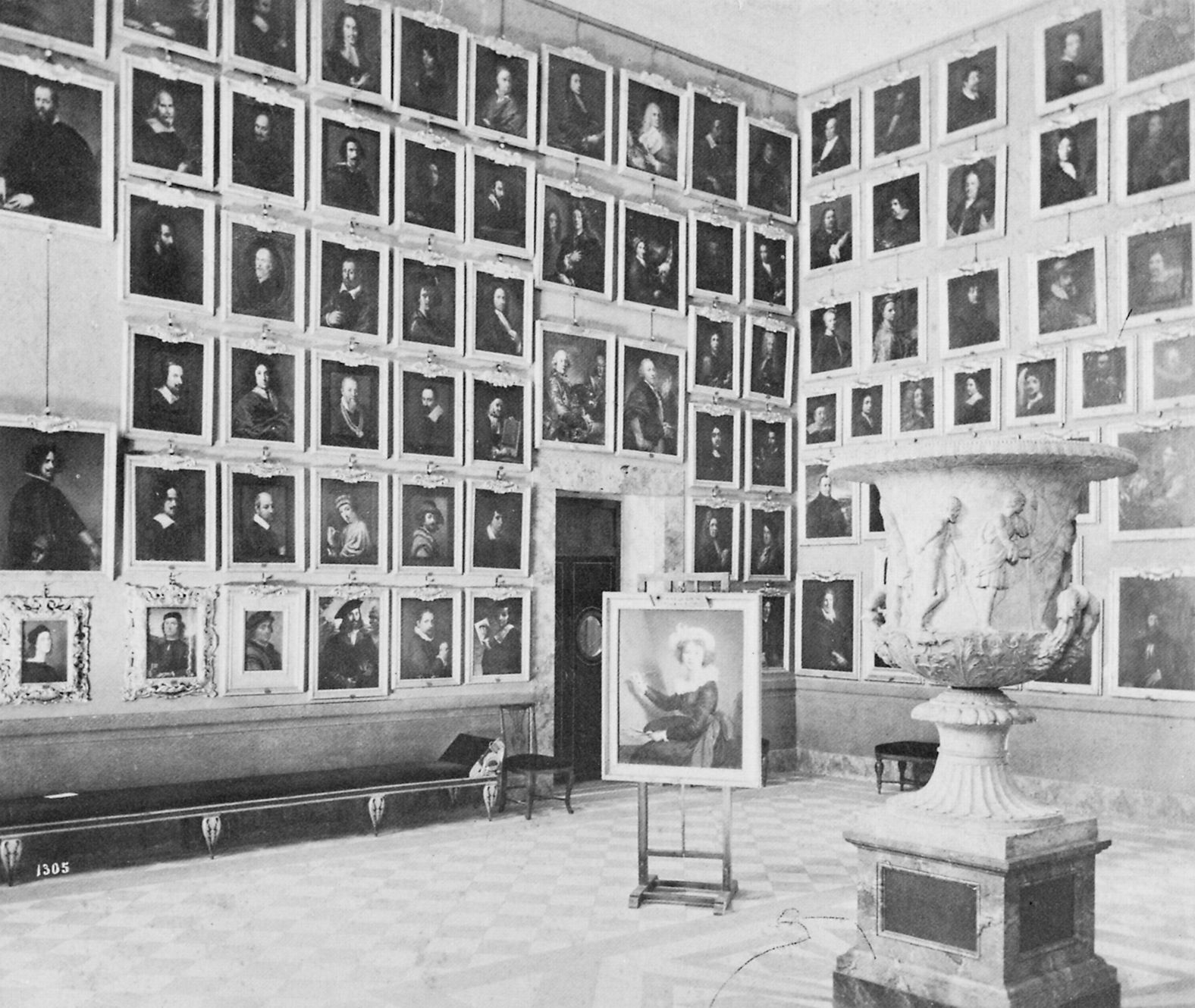
Self-portraits in the Uffizi, c. 1890

Self-portraits in the Uffizi Gallery number over 1,600 and have been collected over the centuries by various owners of the Uffizi. Only a few were ever on show at one time. From 1866 a selection was on show in the Vasari Corridor, but this became too unsafe for the growing stream of visitors in the 1930s and after World War II it was never reopened. The Uffizi has made exhibitions of selections of self-portraits, including a traveling exhibition of self-portraits by women in 2011.

| Painting | Title | Painter | Date | ID |
|---|---|---|---|---|
| | Self-portrait | Filippino Lippi | 1485 | |
| | Self-portrait | Raphael | 1504 | 1706 |
| | Self-portrait | Domenico di Pace Beccafumi | 1525 | |
| | Self-portrait | Hans Holbein | 1542 | 1630 |
| | Self-portrait | Sofonisba Anguissola | 1550 | 1824 |
| | Self-portrait | Alessandro Allori | c. 1555 | 1689 |
| | Self-portrait in Uffizi | Lavinia Fontana | 1579 | 4013 |
| | Self-portrait | Marietta Robusti | 1590s | 1898 |
| | Self-portrait | Arcangela Paladini | 1600s | 2019 |
| | Self Portrait of Gianlorenzo Bernini (1630) | Gian Lorenzo Bernini | 1630 | 1692 |
| | Self-portrait as a young man | Rembrandt | 1634; 1639 | 3890 |
| | Self-portrait (enlarged on all sides) | Rembrandt | 1655 | 1864 |
| | Self-portrait | Rembrandt | 1669 | 1871 |
| | Self-portrait | Giovanni Maria Morandi | 1670; 1680 | 1722 |
| | Self-portrait | Rosalba Carriera | 1710s | 1786 |
| | Self-portrait | Hyacinthe Rigaud | 1716 | 1857 |
| | Self-portrait | Giovanna Fratellini | 1720 | 2064 |
| | Self-portrait | Violante Beatrice Siries | 1750s | |
| | Self-portrait | Duchess Maria Antonia of Bavaria | 1750s | 2065 |
| | Self-Portrait in the Traditional Costume of the Bregenz Forest, Seated at her Easel | Angelica Kauffman | 1757 | 4444 |
| | Self-portrait | Anton Raphael Mengs | 1773 | 1927 |
| | Self-portrait | Maria Cosway | 1778 | 5258 |
| | Self-portrait | Chiara Spinelli | 1783 | 2525 |
| | Self-Portrait, 1787 | Angelica Kauffman | 1787 | 1928 |
| | Self-portrait in Uffizi | Louise Élisabeth Vigée Le Brun | 1790 | 1905 |
| | Self-portrait with three collars | Jacques-Louis David | 1791 | 3090 |
| | Self-portrait | Jean-Baptiste Camille Corot | c. 1835 | 2063 |
| | Self-portrait | Elisa Counis | 1839 | 2096 |
| | Self-portrait | Elise Ransonnet-Villez | 1870s | 3440 |
| | Self-portrait in Uffizi | Therese Schwartze | 1888 | 3122 |
| | Selvportræt | Peder Severin Krøyer | 1888 | 1945 |
| | Self-portrait | Augusto Bastianini | 1900 | 9250 |
| | Self-portrait | Cecilia Beaux | 1900s | 8551 |
| | Self-portrait | Élisabeth Chaplin | 1910 | 9658 |
| | Self-portrait | Philip de László | 1911 | 3576 |
| | Self-portrait | Vittorio Matteo Corcos | 1913 | 3888 |
| | Self-portrait | Marc Chagall | 1959 | |
