= Unione =

Renaissance painting technique

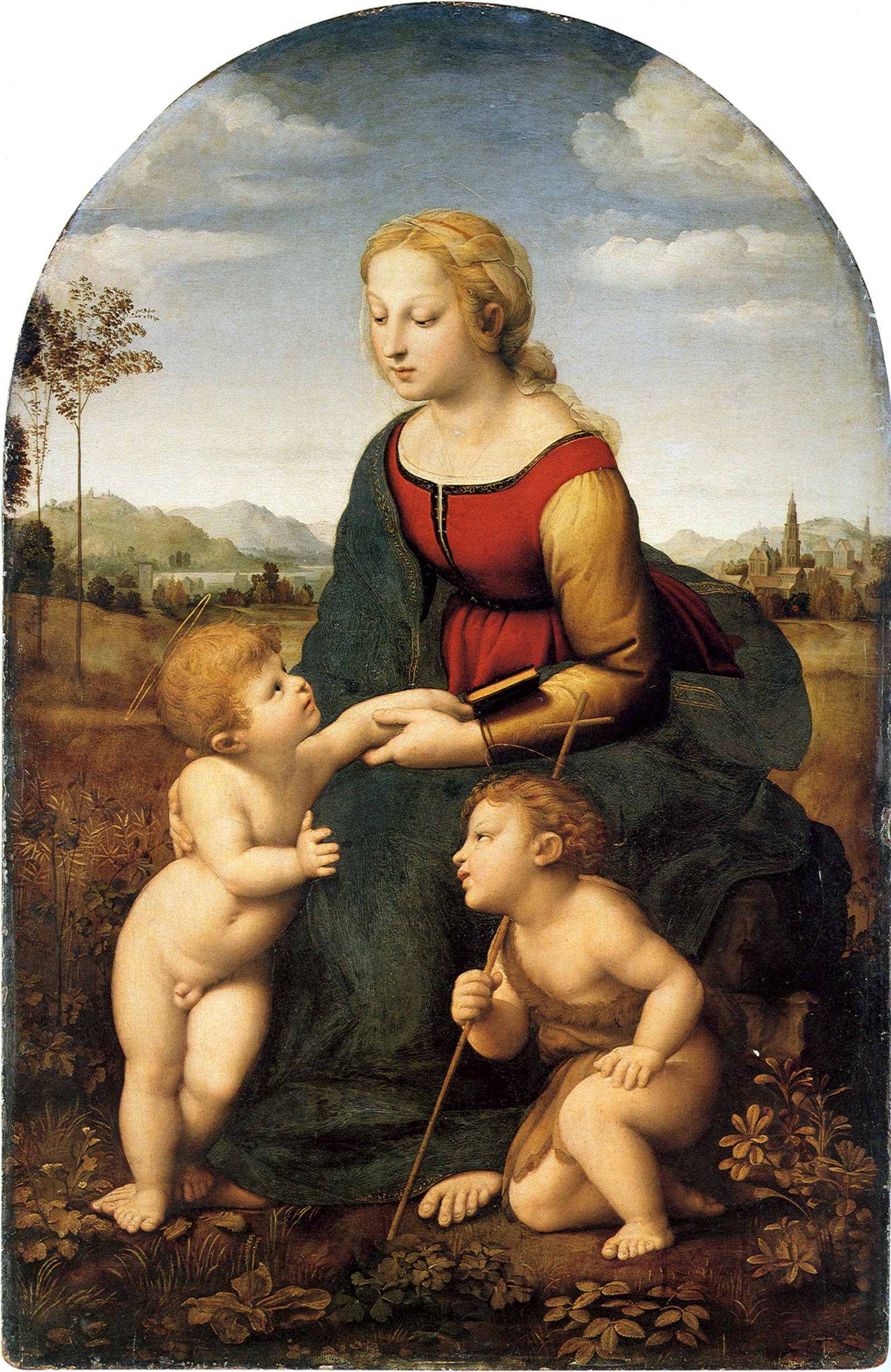
Raphael's La belle jardinière, showing the use of unione

According to the theory of the art historian Marcia B. Hall, which has gained considerable acceptance, unione (Italian: [uˈnjoːne]) is one of the canonical painting modes of the Renaissance; that is, one of four modes of painting colours available to Italian High Renaissance painters, along with sfumato, chiaroscuro and cangiante. Unione was developed by Raphael, who exemplified it in the Stanza della Segnatura.

Unione is similar to sfumato, but is more useful for the edges of chiaroscuro, where vibrant colors are involved. As with chiaroscuro, unione conveys the contrasts, and as sfumato it strives for harmony and unity, but also for coloristic richness. Unione is softer than chiaroscuro in the search for the right tonal key. There should be the harmony between light and dark, without the excesses and accentuation of a chiaroscuro mode.
