= Sfumato =

Painting technique of the Renaissance

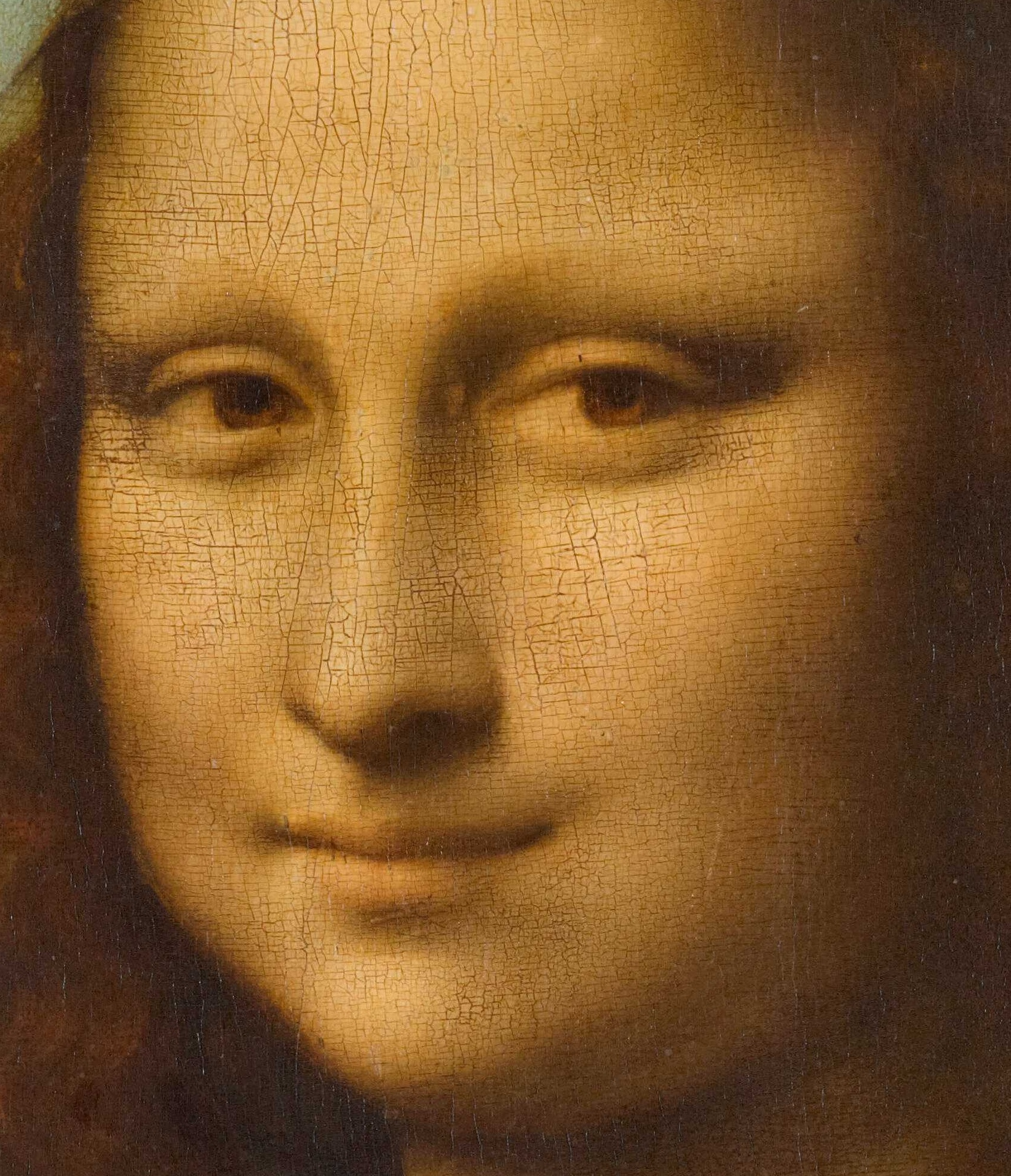
Detail of the face of Mona Lisa showing the use of sfumato, particularly in the shading around the eyes.

Sfumato (English: /sfuːˈmɑːtoʊ/ sfoo-MAH-toh, Italian: [sfuˈmaːto]; lit. 'smoked off', i.e. 'blurred') is a painting technique for softening the transition between colours, mimicking an area beyond what the human eye is focusing on, or the out-of-focus plane. It is one of the canonical painting modes of the Renaissance. Leonardo da Vinci was the most prominent practitioner of sfumato, based on his research in optics and human vision, and his experimentation with the camera obscura. He introduced it and implemented it in many of his works, including the Virgin of the Rocks and in his famous painting of the Mona Lisa. He described sfumato as "without lines or borders, in the manner of smoke".

According to the theory of the art historian Marcia B. Hall, which has gained considerable acceptance, sfumato is one of four modes of painting colours available to Italian High Renaissance painters, along with cangiante, chiaroscuro, and unione.

== Technique ==
The technique is a fine shading meant to produce a soft transition between colours and tones, in order to achieve a more believable image. It is most often used by making subtle gradations that do not include lines or borders, from areas of light to areas of dark. The technique was used not only to give an elusive and illusionistic rendering of the human face, but also to create rich atmospheric effects. Leonardo da Vinci described the technique as blending colours, without the use of lines or borders "in the manner of smoke".

In 2010 researchers from the Centre for Research and Restoration of Museums of France and the European Synchrotron Radiation Facility used X-ray fluorescence spectroscopy, without taking samples, to study nine faces in seven of Leonardo's paintings in the Louvre, including the Mona Lisa. They found that Leonardo modelled the shadows with glazes or very thin layers of paint, applying the glazes in coats only 1 to 2 micrometres thick to a total thickness of no more than 30 to 40 micrometres.

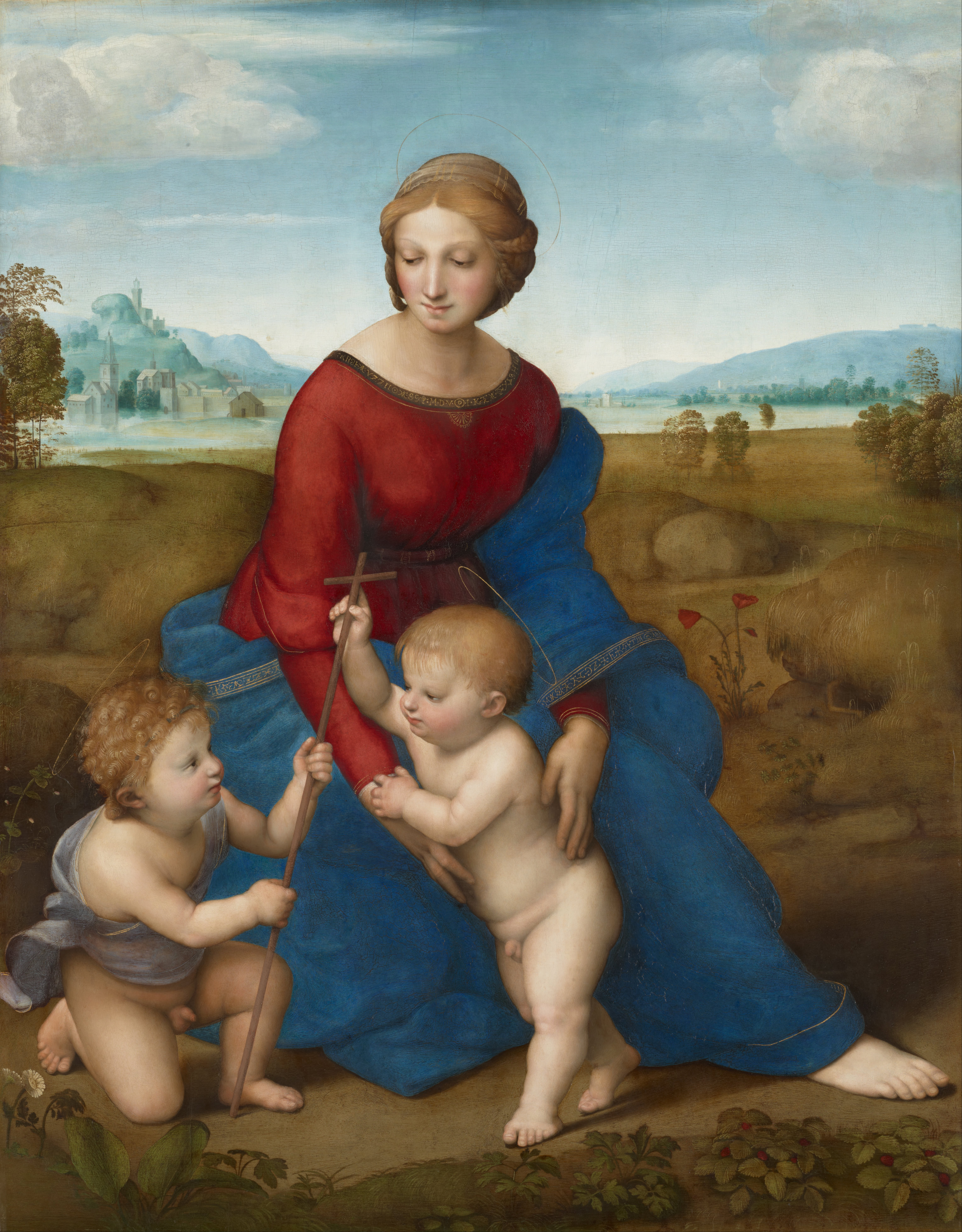
Madonna del Prato (Raphael)

== Practitioners ==
Besides Leonardo and his followers, the Leonardeschi, who often used it heavily, other prominent practitioners of sfumato included Correggio, Raphael, and Giorgione. Raphael's Madonna of the Meadow is a famous example, particularly around Mary's face. The Leonardeschi, painters in or near Milan who were taught by or associated with Leonardo, absorbed sfumato among other features of his art: Francesco Melzi used it to model forms, and Marco d'Oggiono specialised in an exaggerated form of it. Other Leonardeschi include Giovanni Antonio Boltraffio, Giampietrino and Bernardino Luini. Giorgione's The Three Philosophers is said to use sfumato.
