= Cangiante =

One of the canonical painting modes of the Renaissance

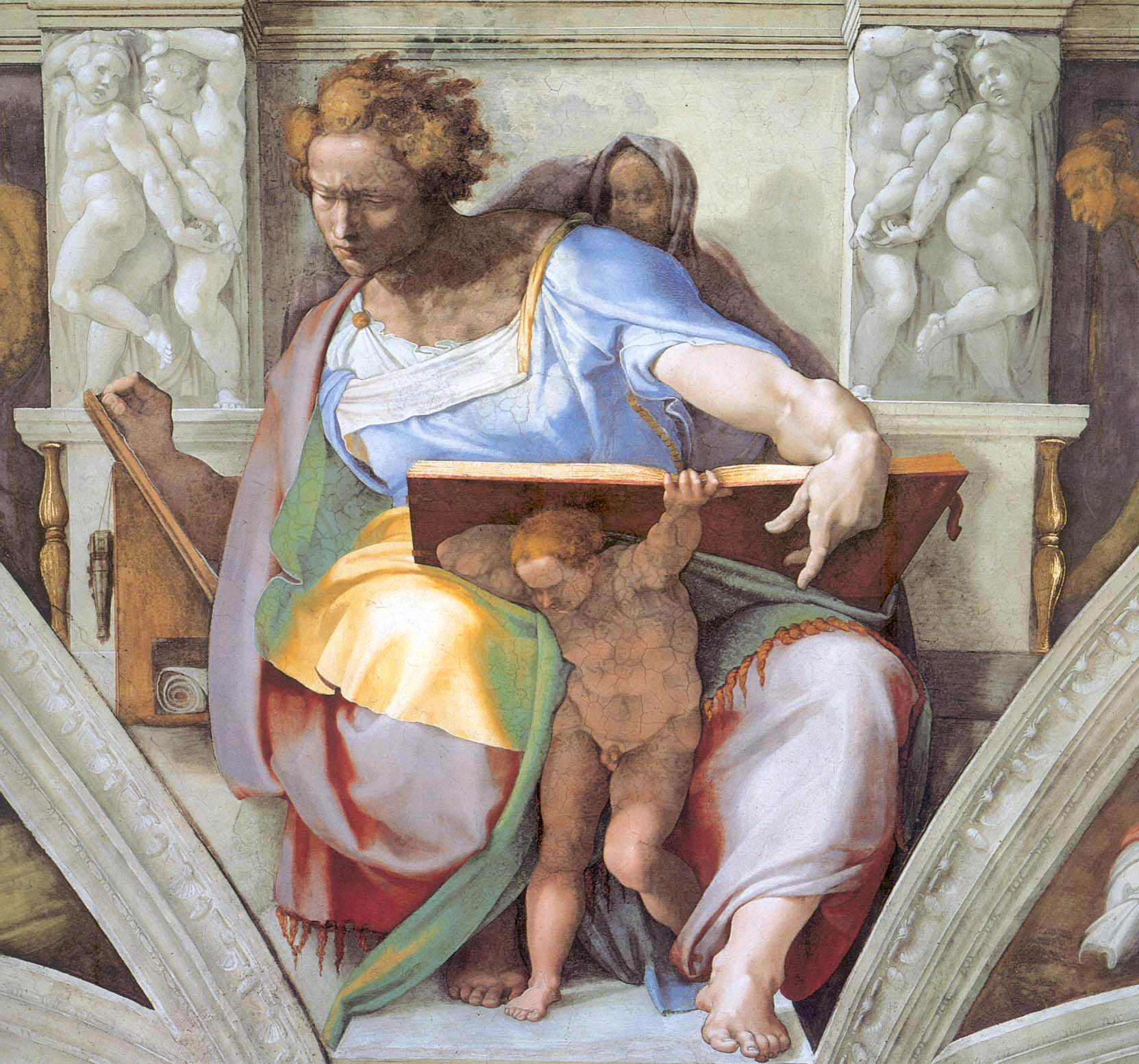
The prophet Daniel from the Sistine Chapel ceiling.

Cangiante (Italian: [kanˈdʒante]) is a painting technique where, when using relatively pure colors, one changes to a different, inherently-darker color to show shading, instead of dulling the original color by darkening it with black or a darker related hue. According to the theory of the art historian Marcia B. Hall, which has gained considerable acceptance, this is one of the canonical painting modes of the Renaissance; i.e. one of the four modes of painting colours available to Italian High Renaissance painters, along with sfumato, chiaroscuro, and unione. The word itself is the present participle of the Italian verb cangiare ("to change"). This approach to the use of color is sometimes referred to as "cangiantismo".

Cangiante is characterized by a change in color when a painted object changes from light to dark (value) due to variations in illumination (light and shadow). For example, when in a painting an object appears yellow in its illuminated area, the artist may use a red color for attached shadows rather than transition to the dark, less colorful, forms of yellow, i.e. yellow-brown, raw umber. There are other methods of rendering shadows (for example, mixing the original hue with black or brown), but these can render the shadow color dull and impure. During the Renaissance, the variety and availability of paint colors were severely limited.

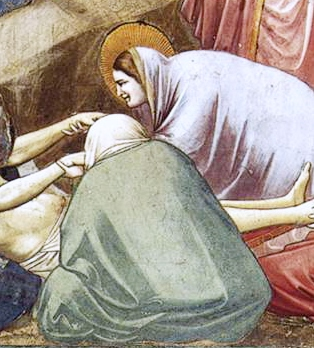
An early example of cangiante by Giotto from the Arena Chapel. Note the shift in color on the robes.

The greatest practitioner of the cangiante technique was Michelangelo, especially in many parts of the Sistine Chapel ceiling. For example, in the image of the prophet Daniel, a transition from green to yellow is evident in the subject's robes. This technique is in contrast to the "chiaroscuro" method of Leonardo and, later, Caravaggio, where attached shadows generally appeared simply as a darker form of the object's color ("local color"), or transitioned to nearly colorless dark earth colors. After Michelangelo's time, the technique found widespread acceptance and is now a standard painting technique.

In late Renaissance Mannerist painting, artists (following the lead of Michelangelo) became quite inventive in their use of cangiantismo, employing it wherever a stronger color effect was needed in a composition. The effect was meant to imitate the quality of "shot silk", sometimes today referred to as "iridescent" material, which shows simultaneous variations in color depending on the angle of illumination and viewpoint.

== See also ==
- Chiaroscuro
- Michelangelo
- Sfumato
- Tenebrism
- Unione
