= La belle jardinière =

Painting by Raphael

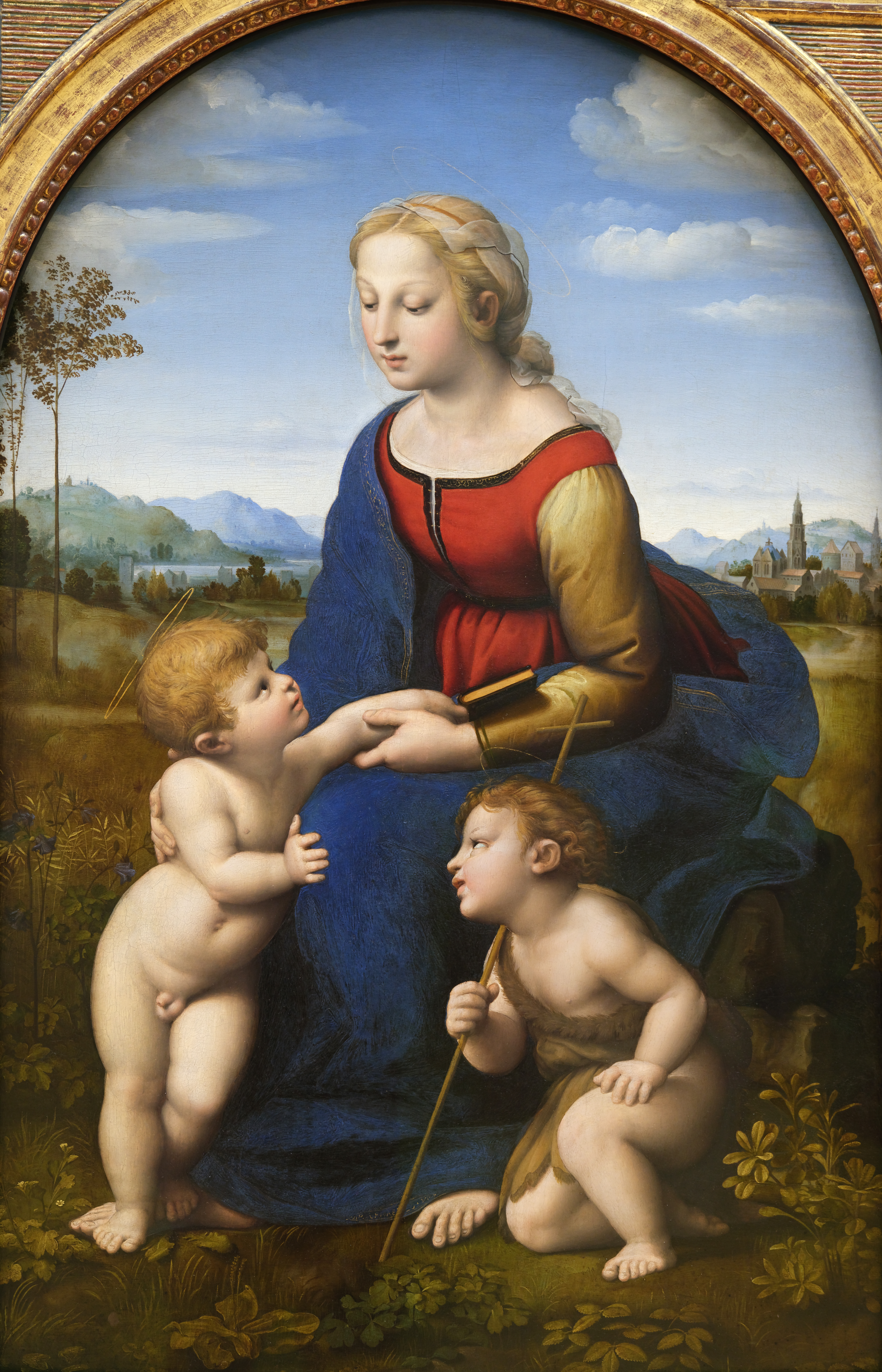
- Artist: Raphael
- Year: 1507–1508
- Medium: Oil on panel
- Dimensions: 122 cm × 80 cm (48 in × 31 1/2 in)
- Location: Louvre, Paris

La Belle Jardinière, also known as the Madonna and Child with Saint John the Baptist, is a painting started by the Italian High Renaissance artist Raphael, and finished by Ridolfo del Ghirlandaio, that depicts the Madonna, a young Christ, and a young John the Baptist. It is believed to have been commissioned by the Sienese patrician Fabrizio Sergardi in approximately 1507. It is currently displayed in the Louvre Museum in Paris, France.

== History ==
This painting is considered one of the most famous Madonna portraits of Italian Renaissance painter, Raphael. Many art historians believe that this painting is the peak of Raphael's achievements and one of his strongest pieces from his Florentine phase. Raphael began to paint La Belle Jardinière after finishing Madonna of the Goldfinch. This work also mirrors his next piece Madonna of the Meadow.

Raphael was unable to complete this painting before he left Florence. It was later finished by Ridolfo del Ghirlandaio. Ghirlandaio is especially credited for completing the blue robe of Mary. The painting was later taken to Paris by King Francis I of France, where it gained in popularity and was copied by many other artists.

== Description ==
The painting portrays Mary, Christ and a young John the Baptist. Mary is the focus of the painting. Her face is situated at the apex of the pyramidal composition and her body fills most of the rest. She is holding the Christ child, who is standing at her foot to her right. John the Baptist is on the ground to the left of Mary and is holding his reed cross with his right hand. Mary is holding a book in the hand that is resting on her lap. There are faint halos around all of their heads, a feature that disappears in the High Renaissance. The landscape of the painting is that of a beautiful countryside garden. Raphael used a unified naturalistic composition with rich and luminous colors and blended light and shadows to help create a highly realistic atmosphere.

== Analysis ==
One of this painting's defining features is the Madonna. She is the focus of the painting. She has a protective arm around Christ as he looks up at her while standing on one of her feet, showing a sense of dependency and childlike trust. On the other side kneels John the Baptist holding one of the two religious symbols seen in the work. Raphael diverged from the previous practice of placing multiple religious symbols in a piece. Instead he combines religious iconography and beautiful landscapes to show both humanism and the teaching of the Catholic Church. The other religious symbol seen is the faint halos that disappeared as artists entered the High Renaissance. The book that the Madonna is holding is believed to contain the foretelling of Christ's death. The way Raphael composed the painting creates a sense of intimacy between Mary and Christ, with John the Baptist as witness. The positions of Mary and Christ, and to a lesser extent John the Baptist, serve as a prefiguration of the Passion and eventual death of Christ. The book Mary holds tells of these eventual events.

== Style ==
Raphael studied the works of Leonardo da Vinci, Michelangelo Buonarroti, and Fra Bartolommeo while in Florence. He traded his use of stiff compositions that were popular during his Umbrian phase in favor of a newer style influenced by his study of these other artist. This painting in particular appears to be derived from Leonardo's models, such as The Virgin and Child with Saint Anne.

The painting echoes the spacious landscapes of Pietro Perugino. He also utilized the popular pyramid composition common with art in the High Renaissance as well as the sfumato technique. Another feature seen in La Belle Jardinière is the highly idealized beauty and grace of the Madonna. Despite taking inspiration from other artist, Raphael was able to move past just recreating others works and add his own styles to benefit his works.

== Other Pictures ==
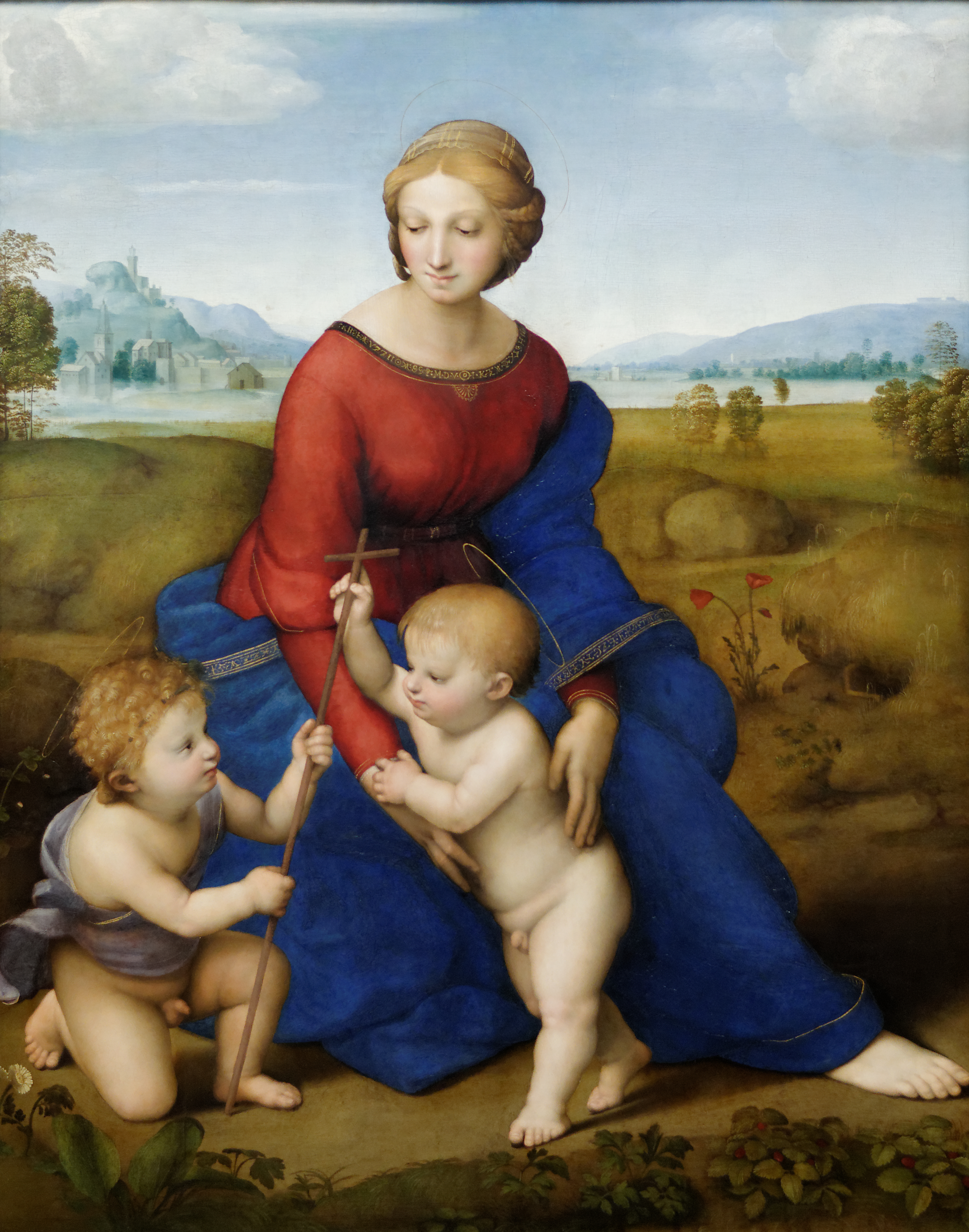
Madonna of the Meadow

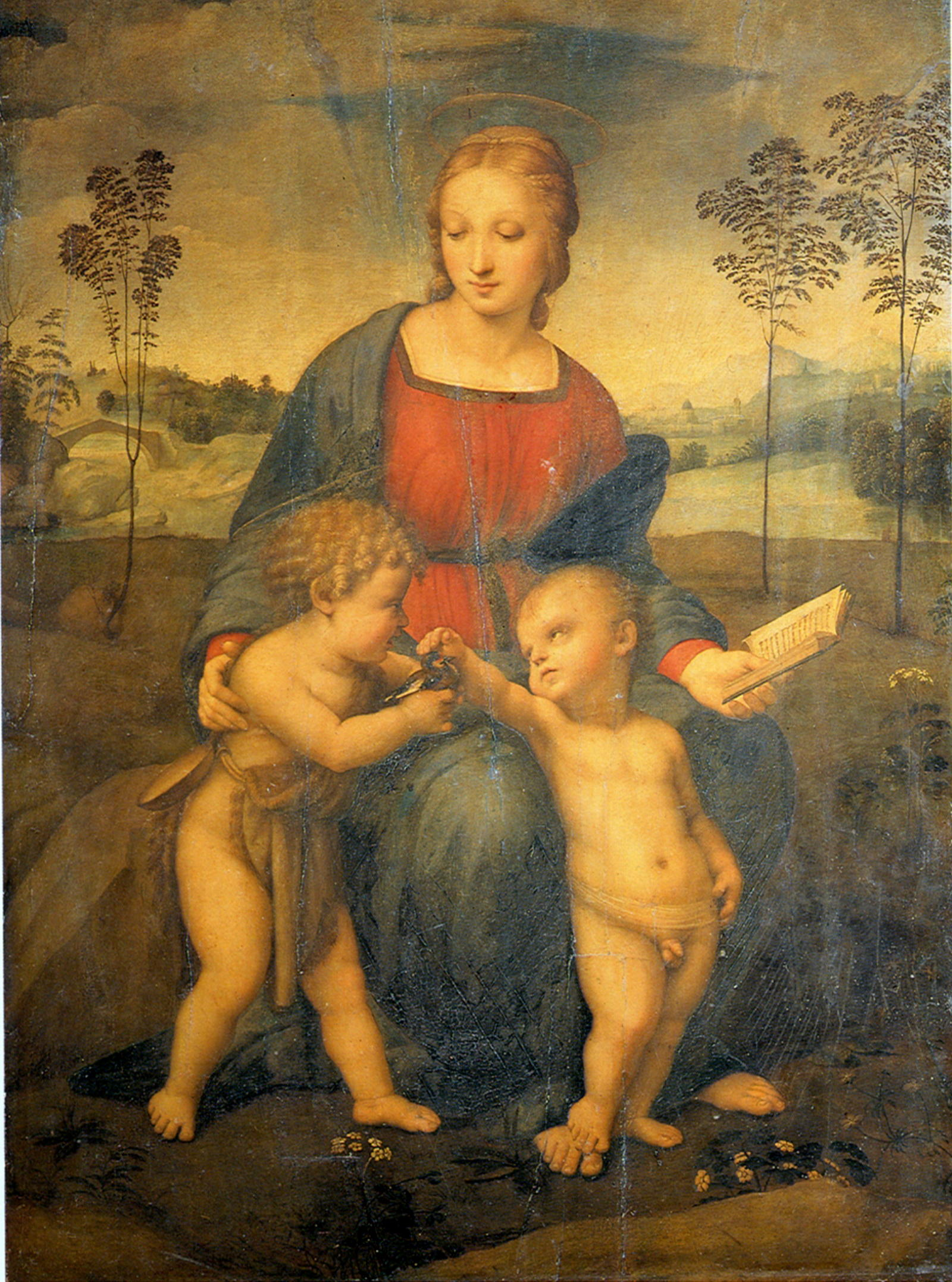
Madonna of the Goldfinch

== See also ==
- List of paintings by Raphael
