= Madonna del Cardellino =

Painting by Raphael

Madonna of the Goldfinch
- Madonna del cardellino (Italian)
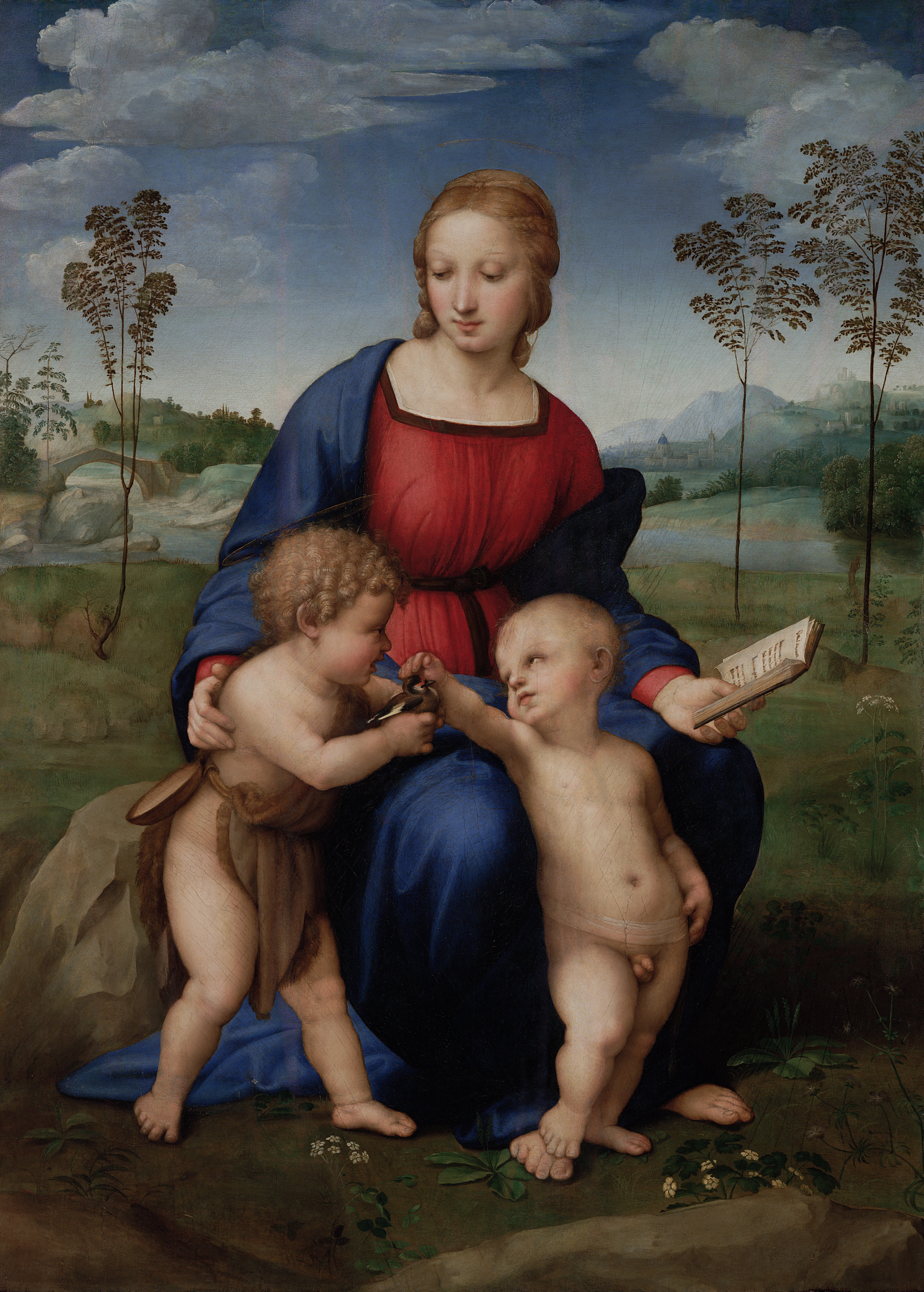
- Artist: Raphael
- Year: c. 1505–06
- Medium: Oil on wood
- Dimensions: 107 cm × 77 cm (42 in × 30 in)
- Location: Galleria degli Uffizi, Florence

The Madonna of the Goldfinch (Italian: Madonna del Cardellino) is an oil on wood painting by the Italian Renaissance artist Raphael, from c. 1505–06. A 10-year restoration process was completed in 2008, after which the painting was returned to its home at the Uffizi in Florence. During the restoration, an antique copy replaced the painting in the gallery.

== Painter ==
Raphael is considered to be a “master” of the High Renaissance, a title he shares with Michelangelo and Leonardo da Vinci. He was born in 1483 and died in 1520, living a mere thirty-seven years. Despite his relatively short lifespan, his influence was significant. He produced a vast quantity of work in a variety of media. He was active in architecture, printmaking, painting, and drawing. During the first half of his career, he spent years in Northern Italy where he was influenced by the Florentine styles he saw there, hence this part of his life is known as his Florentine Period. In 1508, he moved to Rome where he continued to work. Many of his commissions came from the Vatican, including the Apostolic Palace, and one of his most famous works, The School of Athens. Because of his relationship with the church, he and Michelangelo were fierce rivals throughout both their careers, often competing for the same commissions.

During his Florentine period, Raphael painted the Madonna del Cardellino along with several other well-known Madonnas: Madonna of the Meadow and La belle jardinière. All three share several characteristics: Madonna is clothed in red and blue, the same three subjects are painted, the pyramidal composition, the natural background, and the connection to the church through the representation of books, crosses, or, indeed, the goldfinch.

== Painting ==
In this painting, as in most of the Madonnas of his Florentine period, Raphael arranged the three figures – Mary, Christ and the young John the Baptist – to fit into a geometrical design. Though the positions of the three bodies are natural, together they form an almost regular triangle. The Madonna is shown young and beautiful, as with Raphael's various other Madonnas. She is also clothed in red and blue, also typical, for red signifies the Passion of Christ and blue was used to signify the church. Christ and John are still very young, only babies. John holds a goldfinch in his hand, and Christ is reaching out to touch it. The background is one typical of Raphael. The natural setting is diverse and yet all calmly frames the central subject taking place.

The Madonna was a wedding gift from Raphael to his friend Lorenzo Nasi. On 17 November 1548, Nasi's house was destroyed by a landslide and the painting broke into seventeen pieces. It was immediately taken to be salvaged, and was hastily put back together, though the seams were quite visible. In 2002, George Bonsanti of the Precious Stones organisation gave the task of restoration to Patrizia Riitano. During the six-year process that followed, her team worked to remove the years of grime that had degraded the painting's colour, and to fix the damage done by the landslide long ago. Before beginning the project, they studied the work as closely as possible, utilising resources such as X-rays, CAT scans, reflective infrared photography, and lasers. Riitano closely studied the passages of overpainting that had been applied and removed them until the original by Raphael finally shone through. The restoration was completed in 2008, and the painting was put on display in the Uffizi.

In Madonna Del Cardellino, the goldfinch represents Christ's crucifixion. The reason for its association comes from the legend that its red spot was born at the time of the crucifixion. It flew down over the head of Christ and was taking a thorn from His crown, when it was splashed with the drop of His blood. The book in Mary's hand reads Sedes Sapientiae ('Seat of Wisdom'). This term usually is applied to images in which Mary is seated upon a throne, with Jesus on her lap, but in this case, the inscription implies the rock on which Mary sits is her natural throne.

In some versions of Vasari another similar painting is described as the Vallombrosa version but it has never been identified.

== See also ==
- List of paintings by Raphael
