= Ognissanti Madonna =

Painting by Giotto

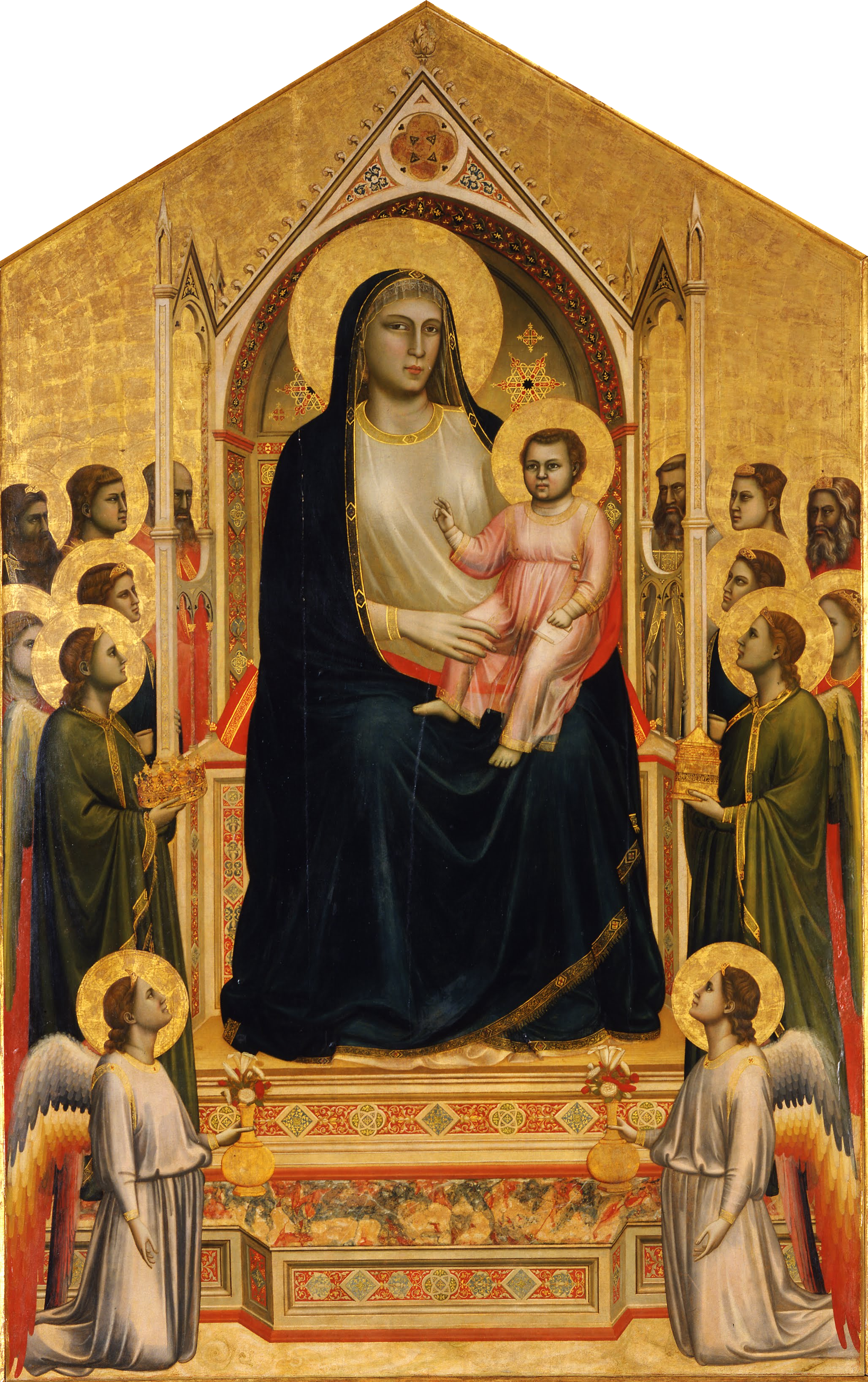
- Artist: Giotto di Bondone
- Year: c. 1310
- Medium: Tempera on panel
- Dimensions: 325 cm × 204 cm (128 in × 80 in)
- Location: Uffizi Gallery, Florence

Madonna Enthroned, also known as the Ognissanti Madonna or Madonna Ognissanti, is a painting in tempera on wood panel by the Italian late medieval artist Giotto di Bondone, now in the Uffizi Gallery of Florence, Italy.

The painting has the traditional Christian subject, of the Madonna and Child, representing the Virgin Mary and the Christ Child seated on her lap, with saints and angels surrounding them on all sides. This particular representation of the Virgin, enthroned and surrounded by a court-like company, is called a Maestà, a popular representation at the time. It is often celebrated as the first painting of Italian Renaissance painting due to its newfound naturalism and escape from the constraints of Italo-Byzantine and Gothic art.

It is generally dated to around 1310. While historians have had trouble finding specific information for indisputably attributing many of Giotto's works to the artist, Madonna Enthroned is one piece for which there are a few documents supporting its creation by Giotto. There are many sources that show he spent many years living and creating in Florence. However, the main source that documents Madonna Enthroned specifically is artist Lorenzo Ghiberti's autobiography, I Commentarii (1447). An earlier manuscript document of 1418 also attributes the painting to Giotto, but it is Ghiberti's autobiography that provides the most solid evidence.

One of Giotto's later works, Madonna Enthroned was completed in Florence, upon the artist's return to the city. It was originally painted for the Ognissanti church in Florence. Built for the Humiliati, a small religious order at the time, the church had many acclaimed paintings designed for it. Specifically, Giotto's Madonna Enthroned was designed for the high altar.

== Influences ==
The 'Madonna Enthroned' shows the numerous styles of art that influenced Giotto. In both the gold coloring used throughout the artwork and the flat gold ground, Giotto's art continued the traditional Italo-Byzantine style usual in the proto-Renaissance period. The altarpiece represents a formalized representation of an icon, still retaining the stiffness of Byzantine art, and Giotto retained the hierarchy of scale, making the centralized Madonna and the Christ Child much larger in size than the surrounding saints and religious figures.

Giotto's figures, however, escape the bounds of Byzantine art. His figures are weighty and are reminiscent of three-dimensional sculptures, such as those in classical Roman sculpture. The Madonna's intricately decorated throne, which itself is an Italian Gothic design, has a very specific use of colored marble as a surface decoration. This method of decoration, based on a style called Cosmatesque or Cosmati, was popular in Rome since the Early Christian period and in Tuscany in the Late Middle Ages.

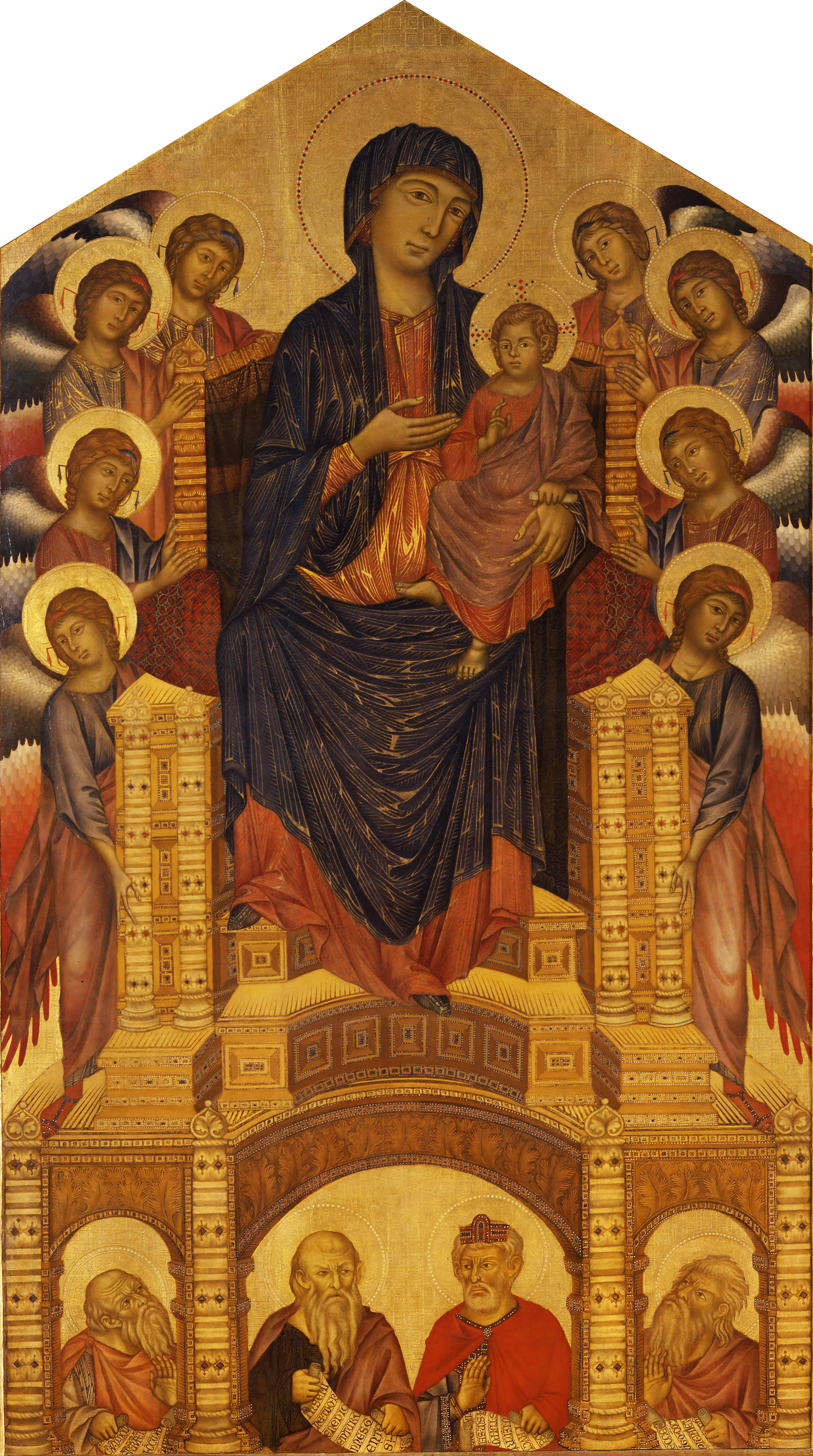
Cimabue's Santa Trinita Maestà, c. 1290, Uffizi, Florence

There were, additionally, a number of specific artists whose styles heavily influenced the Ognissanti Madonna. The influence of Cimabue, traditionally recognized as Giotto's teacher (based on Giorgio Vasari's 16th century Lives of the Most Excellent Painters, Sculptors, and Architects), is shown first in the very symmetrical composition of the piece. Cimabue portrayed the same subject of symmetry in his Santa Trinita Maestà (c. 1290, also Uffizi), also a Virgin and Child Enthroned, and both pieces share aspects of the Italo-Byzantine style, with Cimabue's having more Byzantine attributes. Additionally, the two depictions of the angels' wings in Giotto and Cimabue's pieces clearly resemble each other. Both pieces share a similar, initial feeling of severity, yet there is more to each piece than the drama. Giotto adopted from his teacher the importance of, and the concern for, volume and forms in space.

The tranquility of Giotto's figures resembled also the style of Pietro Cavallini. From this artist, who painted neo-Byzantine pieces, taking cues from both mosaics and frescos from Roman and Early Christian times, Giotto took important lessons in the technique of painting, and in rendering figures as statuesque and calm.

Lastly, Giotto took cues from many contemporary sculptors, including Nicola and Giovanni Pisano, whose work shares influences of Northern Gothic art. In the work of these artists, Giotto saw great, dramatic compositions that would certainly influence his Ognissanti Madonna.

== Technique ==
Giotto used a much smaller space than other contemporary artists, further emphasizing the importance of the bodies in the artwork. Giotto did away with many aspects of Byzantine art that would flatten the painting. Within Cimabue's Santa Trinita Maestà, there is the use of gold tracing to delineate the folds of the fabric. In contrast to this, Giotto's fabric folds are more realistic, and instead of lines he used light, shadow, and color to create the appearance of fabric. Contours of the body underneath these fabric folds are also visible, specifically in the Virgin's knees and also around her breasts.

Giotto used a value scale, a distinct range of light and dark, to create a sense of volume in his figures, giving them the slight smokiness that is usually characteristic of Leonardo da Vinci and later Renaissance artists. Unlike in other paintings by Giotto, the light source in Ognissanti Madonna is located on the right side of the piece as opposed to the left. The meaning behind this is not known for sure, although a few logical reasons for this could be the Ognissanti Madonna's placement within the church or Giotto's use of exaggeration with lighting.
