= Uffizi =

Art museum in Florence, Italy

- Galleria degli Uffizi

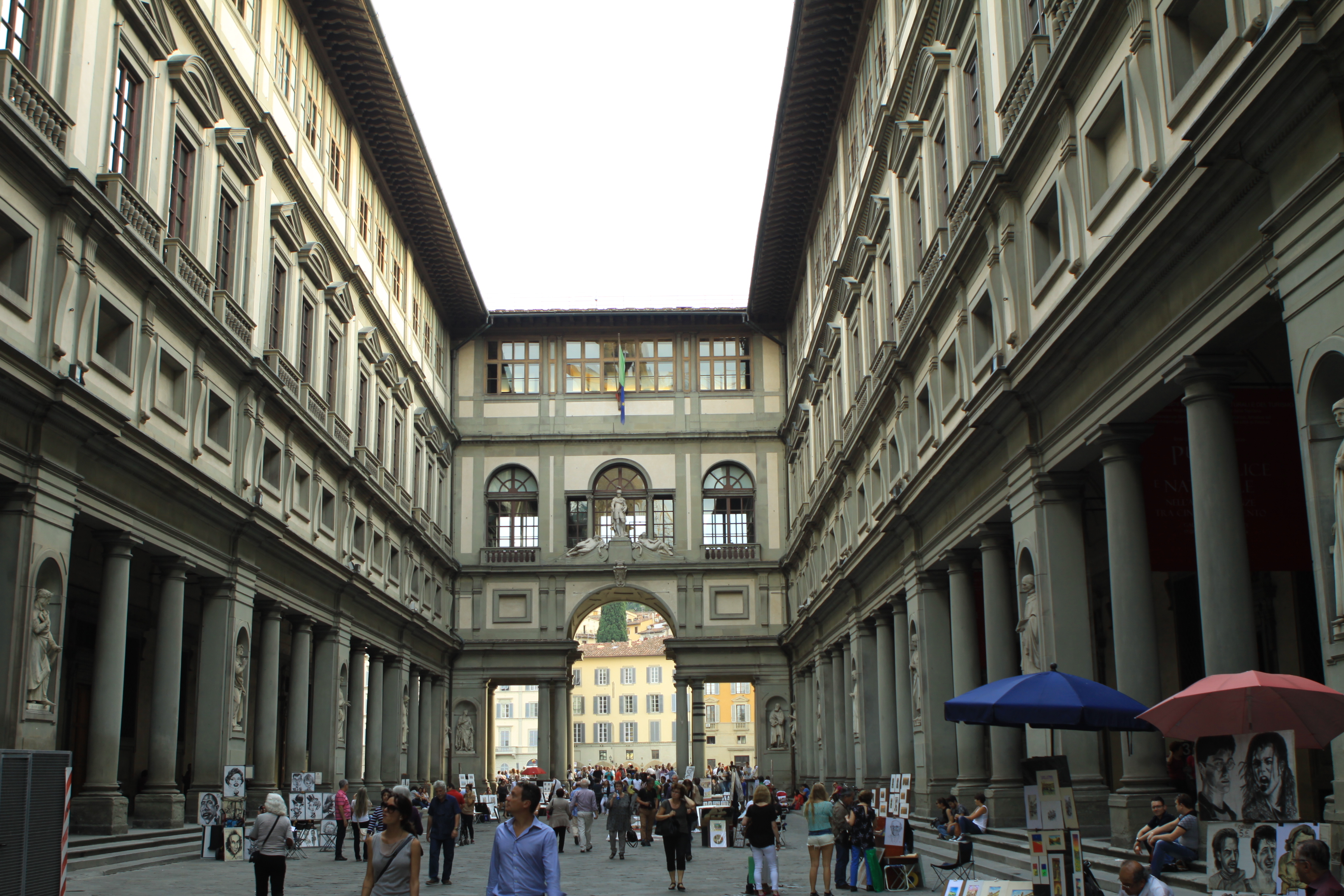
- Narrow courtyard between the two wings of the museum, with view toward the Arno river
- Interactive fullscreen map
- Established: 1581; 445 years ago
- Location: Piazzale degli Uffizi, 50122 Florence, Italy
- Coordinates: 43°46′06″N 11°15′19″E
- Type: Art museum, design/textile museum, historic site
- Visitors: 5,249,968 (2024)
- Director: Simone Verde
- Website: www.uffizi.it/en

The Uffizi Gallery (UK: /juːˈfɪtsi, ʊˈfiːtsi/ yoo-FIT-see, uu-FEET-see; Italian: Galleria degli Uffizi, pronounced [ɡalleˈriːa deʎʎ ufˈfittsi]) is an art museum adjacent to the Piazza della Signoria in the Historic Centre of Florence in the region of Tuscany, Italy. It is one of the most visited museums in Italy and among the most important worldwide for its Italian Renaissance art collection.

After the demise of the House of Medici, the family's art collections were given to the city of Florence under the Patto di famiglia ("family pact") negotiated by Anna Maria Luisa de' Medici, the last Medici heiress. The Uffizi is one of the first modern museums, open to visitors by request since the sixteenth century. In 1769 it was officially opened to the public and formally registered as a museum in 1865.

== History ==
Construction of the Uffizi complex began in 1560. Giorgio Vasari was commissioned by Cosimo I de' Medici to create a home for various committees, agencies, and guilds established in Florence, hence the name uffizi, "offices". Construction continued under Alfonso Parigi and Bernardo Buontalenti. The work was completed in 1581. The top floor served as a gallery, housing the Medici collection of Roman sculptures.

The cortile (internal courtyard) is so long, narrow, and open to the Arno at its far end through a Doric screen that articulates the space without blocking it, that architectural historians treat it as the first regularized streetscape of Europe. Vasari, a painter and architect as well, emphasized its perspective length by adorning it with the matching facades' continuous roof cornices, and unbroken cornices between storeys, as well as the three continuous steps on which the museum fronts stand. The niches in the piers that alternate with columns of the Loggiato were filled with sculptures of famous artists in the 19th century.

The Uffizi brought together under one roof the administrative offices and the Archivio di Stato, the state archive. The project was intended to display prime artworks of the Medici collections on the piano nobile; the plan was carried out by his son, Grand Duke Francesco I. He commissioned the architect Buontalenti to design the Tribuna degli Uffizi that would display a series of masterpieces in one room, including jewels; it became a highly influential attraction of a Grand Tour. The octagonal room was completed in 1584.

Over the years, more sections of the building were recruited to exhibit paintings and sculptures collected or commissioned by the Medici. For many years, 45 to 50 rooms were used to display paintings from the 13th to 18th century.

== Modern era ==
Because of its vast collection, some of the Uffizi's works have in the past been transferred to other museums in Florence—for example, some famous statues to the Bargello. A project was finished in 2006 to expand the museum's exhibition space some 6,000 metres^{2} (64,000 ft^{2}) to almost 13,000 metres^{2} (139,000 ft^{2}), allowing public viewing of many artworks that had usually been in storage.

The Nuovi Uffizi (New Uffizi) renovation project, which started in 1989, was progressing well from 2015 to 2017. It was intended to modernize all of the halls and more than double the display space. A new exit was also planned, and the lighting, air conditioning, and security systems were updated. During construction, the museum remained open, although rooms were closed as necessary, with the artwork temporarily moved to another location. For example, the Botticelli rooms and two others with early Renaissance paintings were closed for 15 months but reopened in October 2016.

Over two million people visited the Uffizi in 2016, making it the most visited art gallery in Italy. At peak periods (particularly in July), waiting times for entry can be up to five hours. Advance tickets can be bought online to significantly reduce the waiting time. In 2018, a revised ticketing system was introduced to reduce queuing times to just minutes.

Due to the COVID-19 pandemic, the museum was closed for 150 days in 2020, and attendance plunged by 72 percent to 659,043. Nonetheless, the Uffizi was 27th in the list of most-visited art museums in the world in 2020. Works from the Uffizi gallery collection are now available for remote viewing on Google Arts and Culture. The museum reopened in May 2021 following a renovation that included an addition of 14 new rooms and a display of additional 129 artworks, with the museum attempting to give more voice to historically under-represented groups including women and people of color.

== Incidents ==
The flood of 1966 severely damaged collections in Florence, including the Uffizi's. The superintendent of the gallery, Ugo Procacci, and other employees went to the museum early in the morning to save as much as possible. Cimabue's crucifix in Santa Croce Church was one of the most damaged artifacts and a symbol of the devastation of the flood. The Uffizi Photographic Department rooms were affected, damaging equipment and photographs.

On 27 May 1993, the Sicilian Mafia carried out a car bomb explosion in Via dei Georgofili which damaged parts of the palace and killed five people. The blast destroyed five pieces of art and damaged another 30. Some of the paintings were fully protected by bulletproof glass. The most severe damage was to the Niobe room and classical sculptures and neoclassical interior, which have since been restored. However, its frescoes were damaged beyond repair.

On 22 July 2022, members of the climate activist group Ultima Generazione (Last Generation) glued themselves to the glass protecting Sandro Botticelli's Primavera demanding an end to fossil fuel usage. The painting was undamaged.

On 13 February 2024, members of Ultima Generazione glued images of flooding in Tuscany in 2023 to the glass protecting Sandro Botticelli's Birth of Venus in protest over the Italian government's inaction on climate change. The painting was undamaged, and the images were removed.

== Key works ==
- Cimabue: Santa Trinita Maestà
- Duccio: Rucellai Madonna
- Giotto: Ognissanti Madonna, Badia Polyptych
- Simone Martini: Annunciation with St. Margaret and St. Ansanus
- Ambrogio Lorenzetti: Presentation at the Temple
- Gentile da Fabriano, Adoration of the Magi
- Paolo Uccello: The Battle of San Romano
- Rogier van der Weyden: Lamentation of Christ
- Fra Filippo Lippi: Madonna and Child, Coronation of the Virgin
- Piero della Francesca: Diptych of Federico da Montefeltro and Battista Sforza
- Andrea del Verrocchio: The Baptism of Christ
- Hugo van der Goes: Portinari Triptych
- Sandro Botticelli: Primavera, The Birth of Venus, Adoration of the Magi of 1475 and others
- Michelangelo: The Holy Family (Doni Tondo)
- Leonardo da Vinci: The Annunciation, Adoration of the Magi
- Piero di Cosimo: Perseus Freeing Andromeda
- Albrecht Dürer: Adoration of the Magi
- Raphael: Madonna of the Goldfinch, Portrait of Leo X
- Titian: Flora, Venus of Urbino
- Parmigianino: Madonna with the Long Neck
- Caravaggio: Bacchus, Sacrifice of Isaac, Medusa
- Artemisia Gentileschi: Judith and Holofernes
- Rembrandt: Self-portrait as a Young Man (attribution doubtful), Self-portrait as an Old Man, Portrait of an Old Man

The collection also contains some ancient sculptures, such as the Arrotino, the Two Wrestlers, Venus de' Medici, and the Bust of Severus Giovanni.

== Films ==
- Inside the Uffizi. It, De, USA, 2021, 97 min. (documentary by Corinna Belz and Enrique Sánchez Lansch)

== Gallery ==
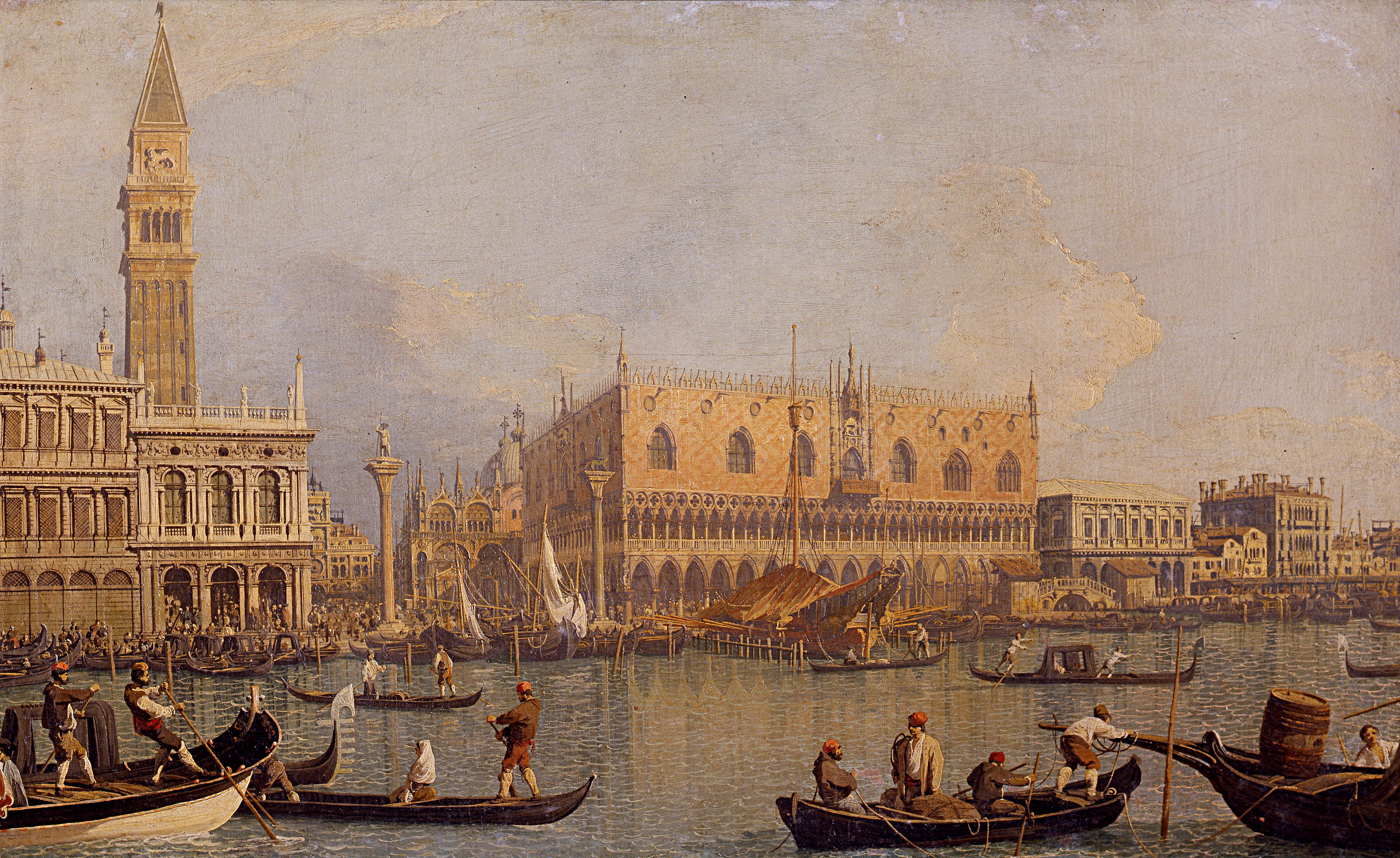
Canaletto, Veduta del Palazzo Ducale di Venezia

Sandro Botticelli, The Birth of Venus

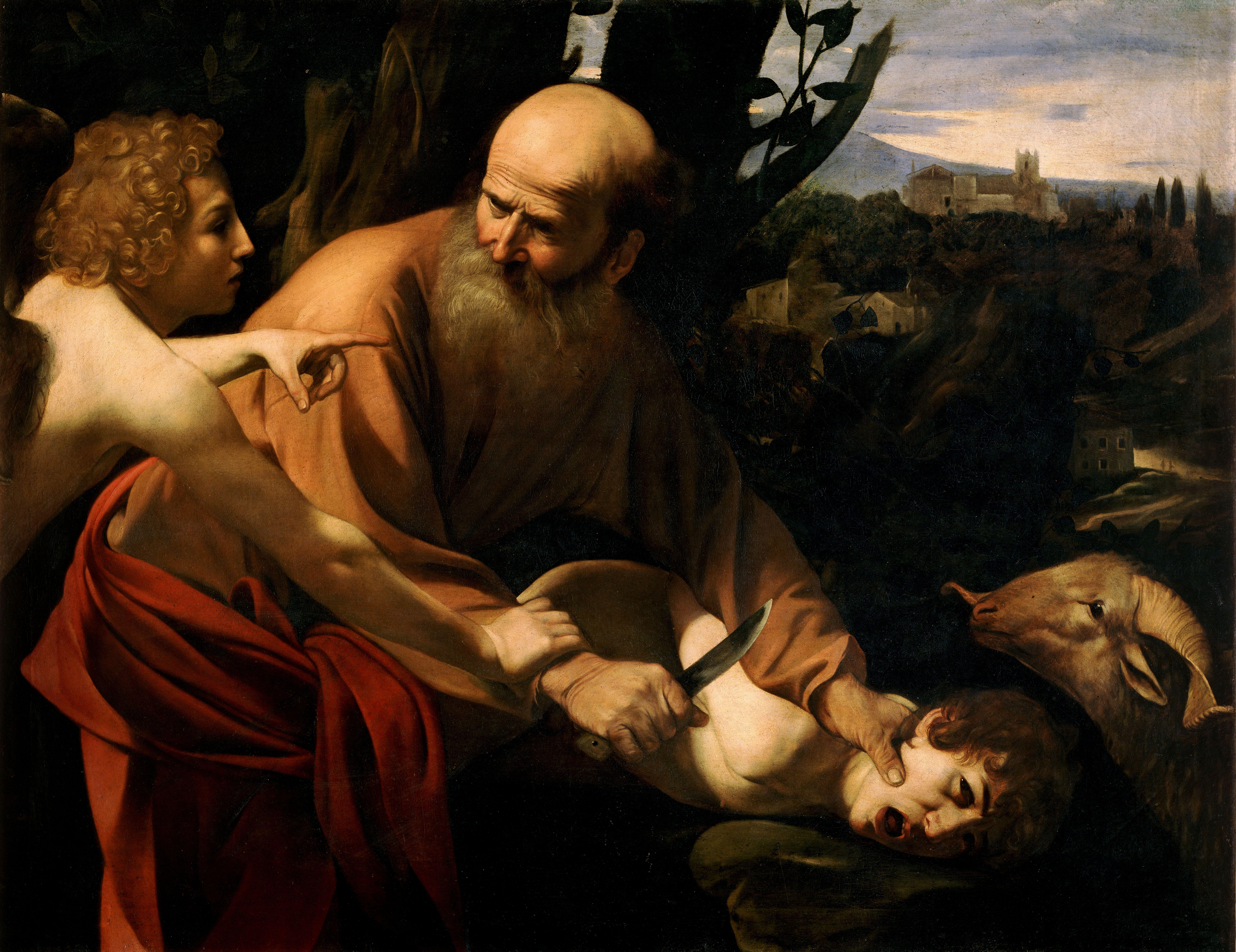
Caravaggio, Sacrificio di Isacco

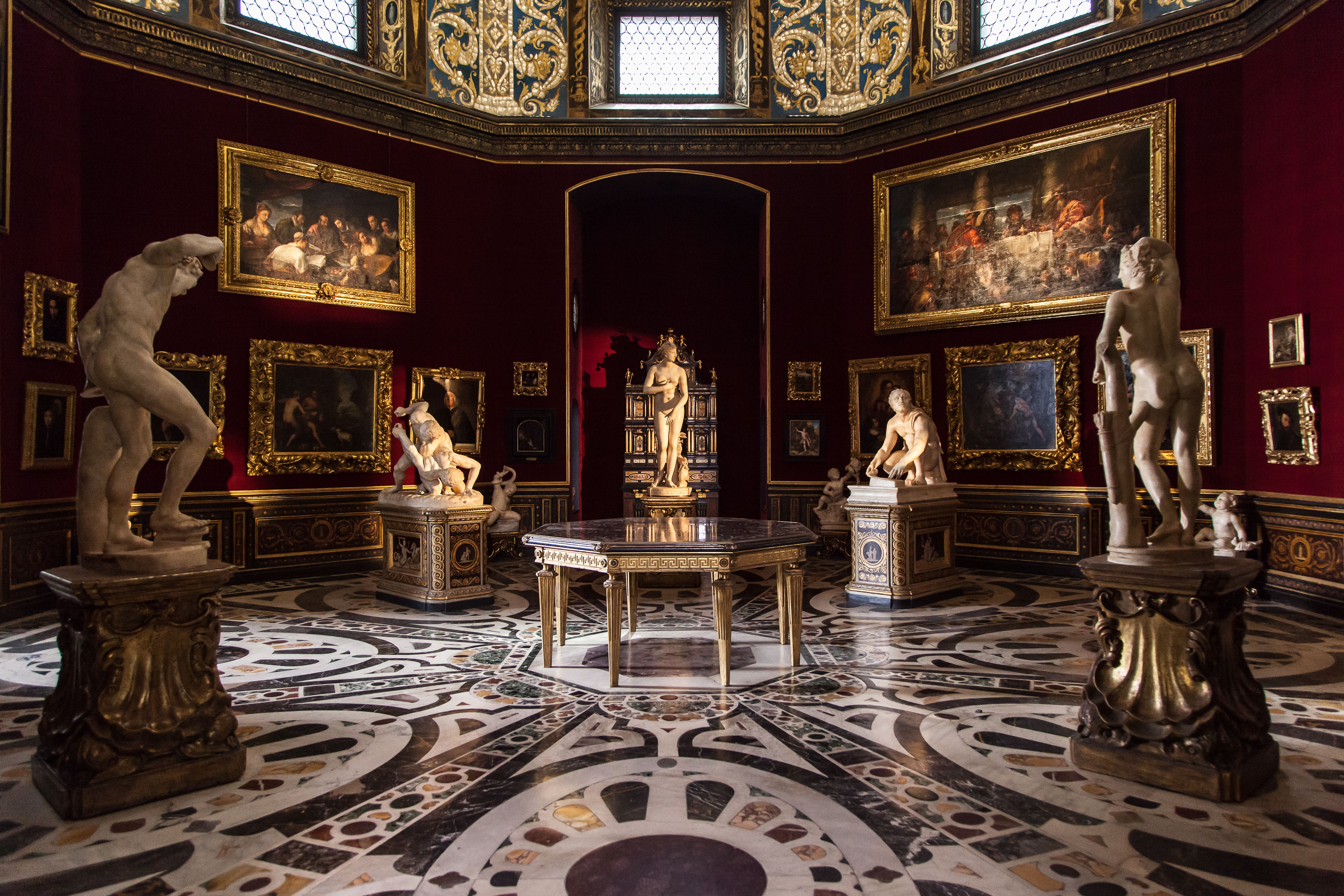
Tribuna of the Uffizi

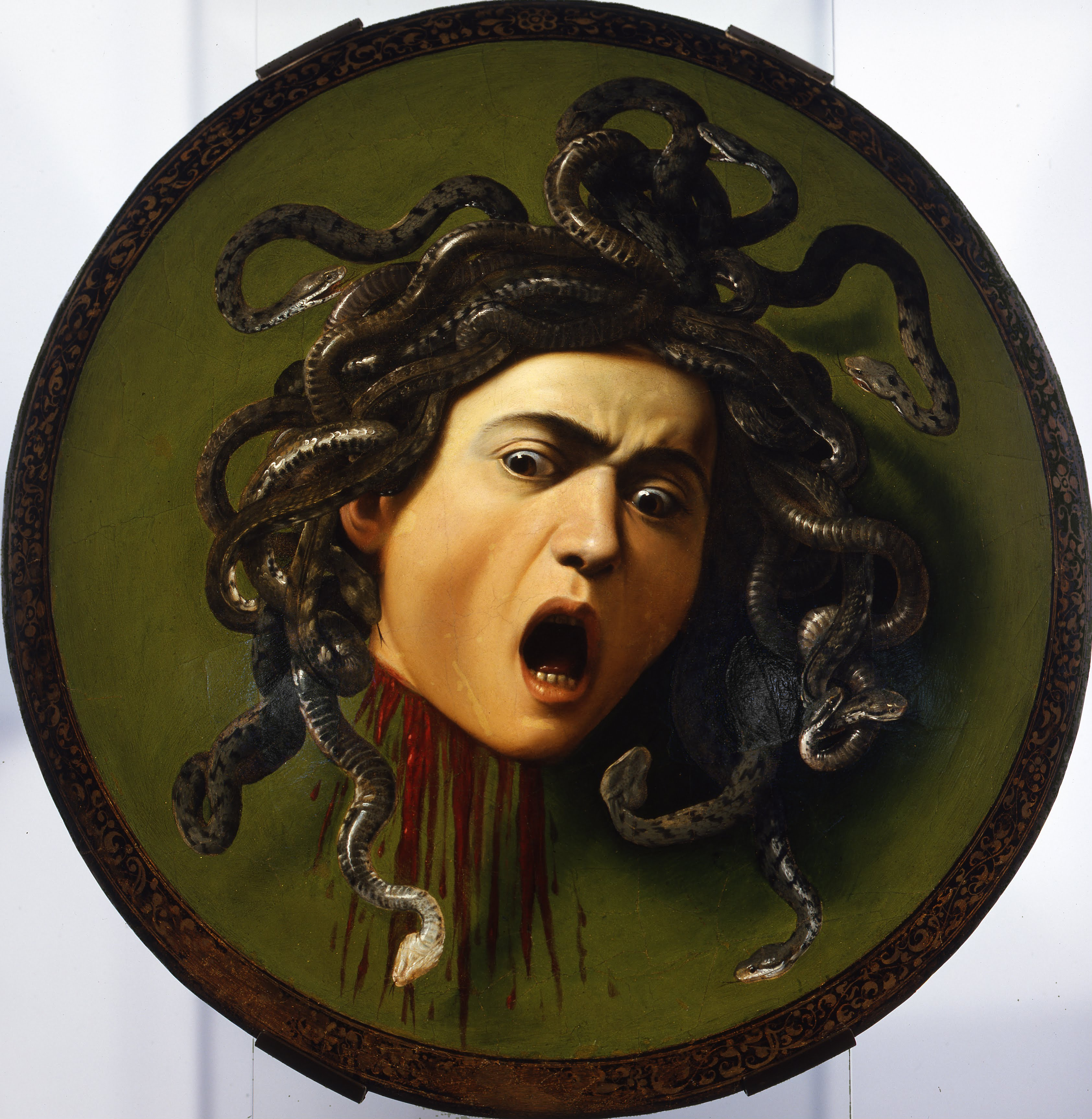
Caravaggio, Medusa

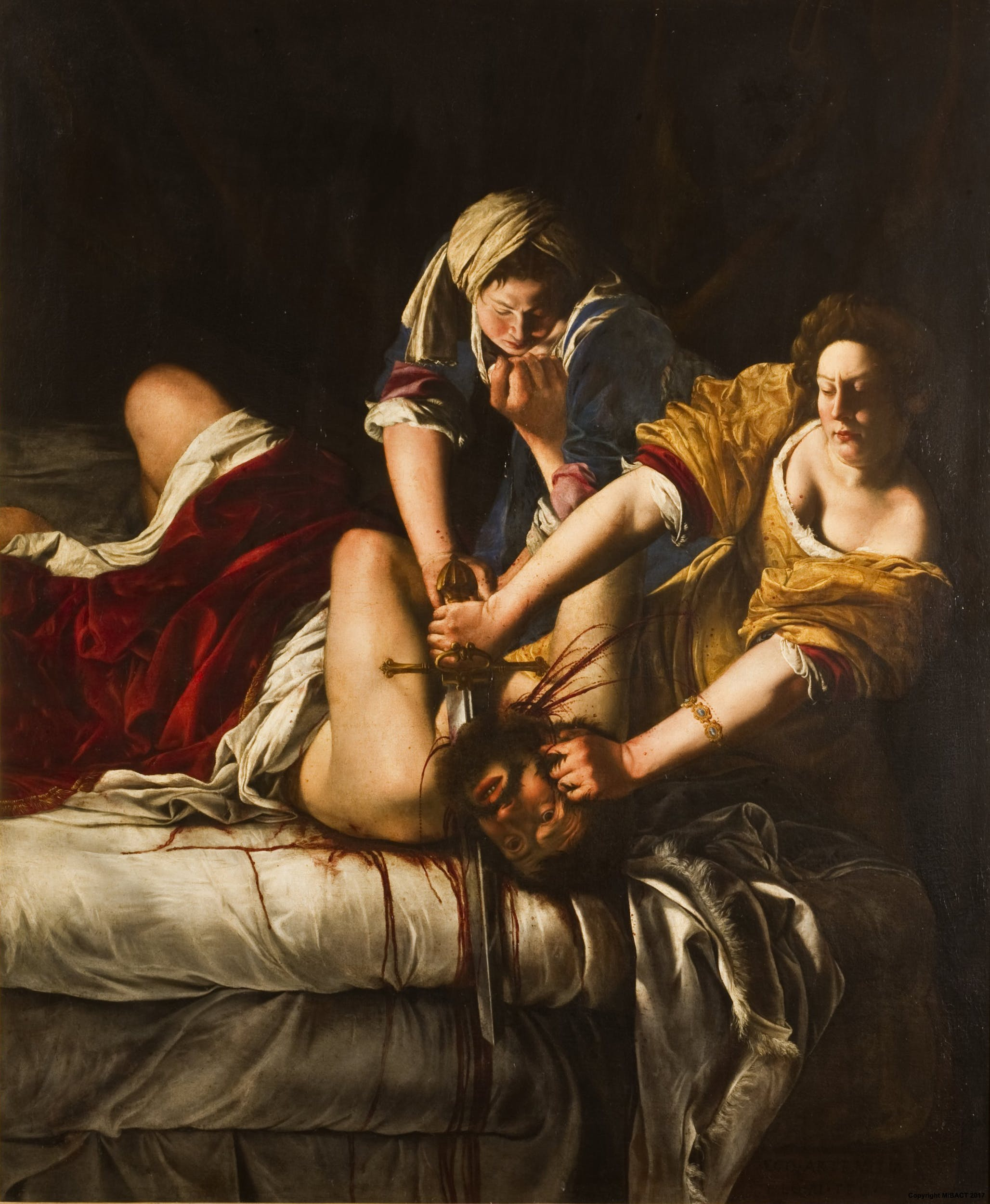
Artemisia Gentileschi, Judith Beheading Holofernes

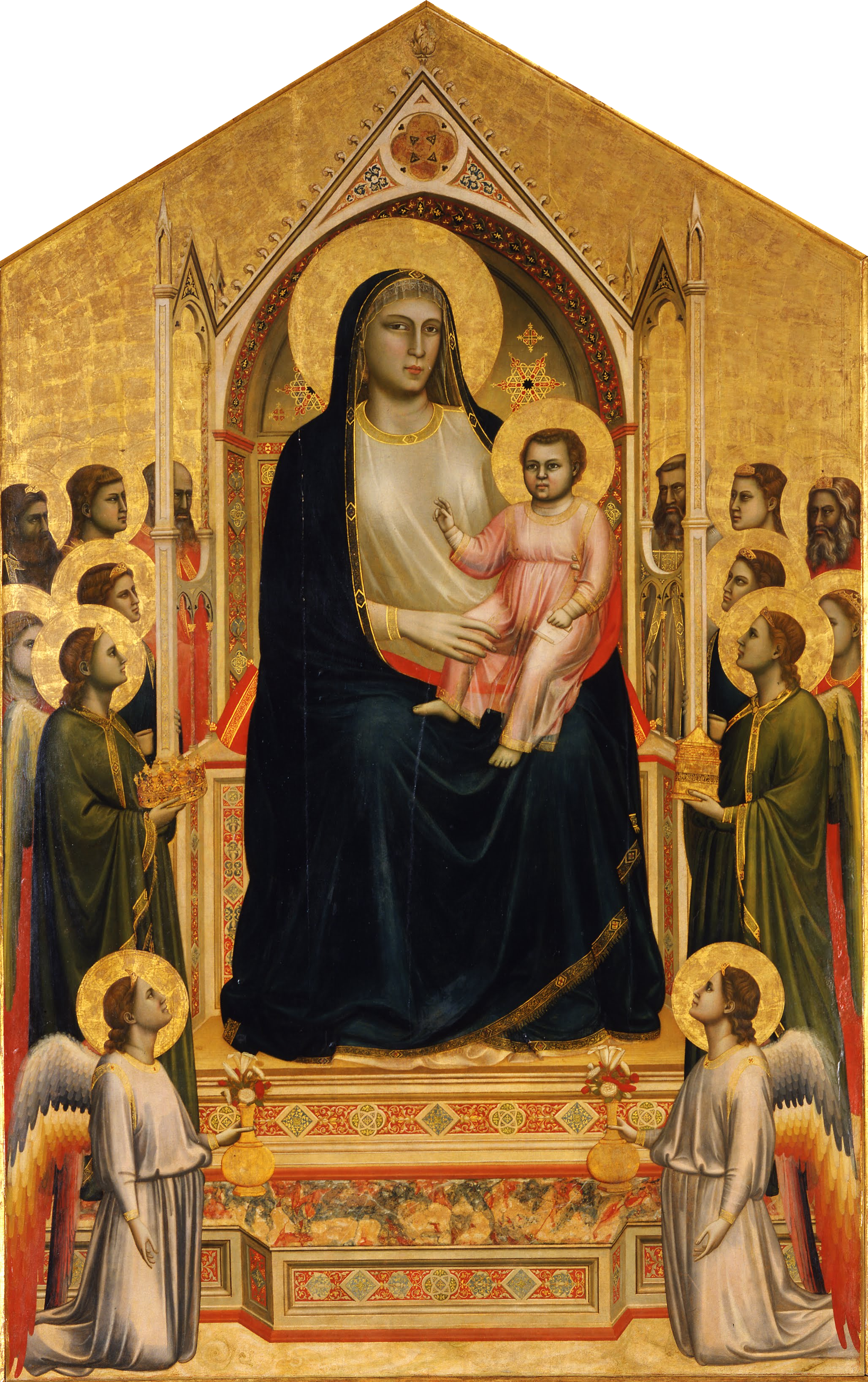
Giotto, Ognissanti Madonna

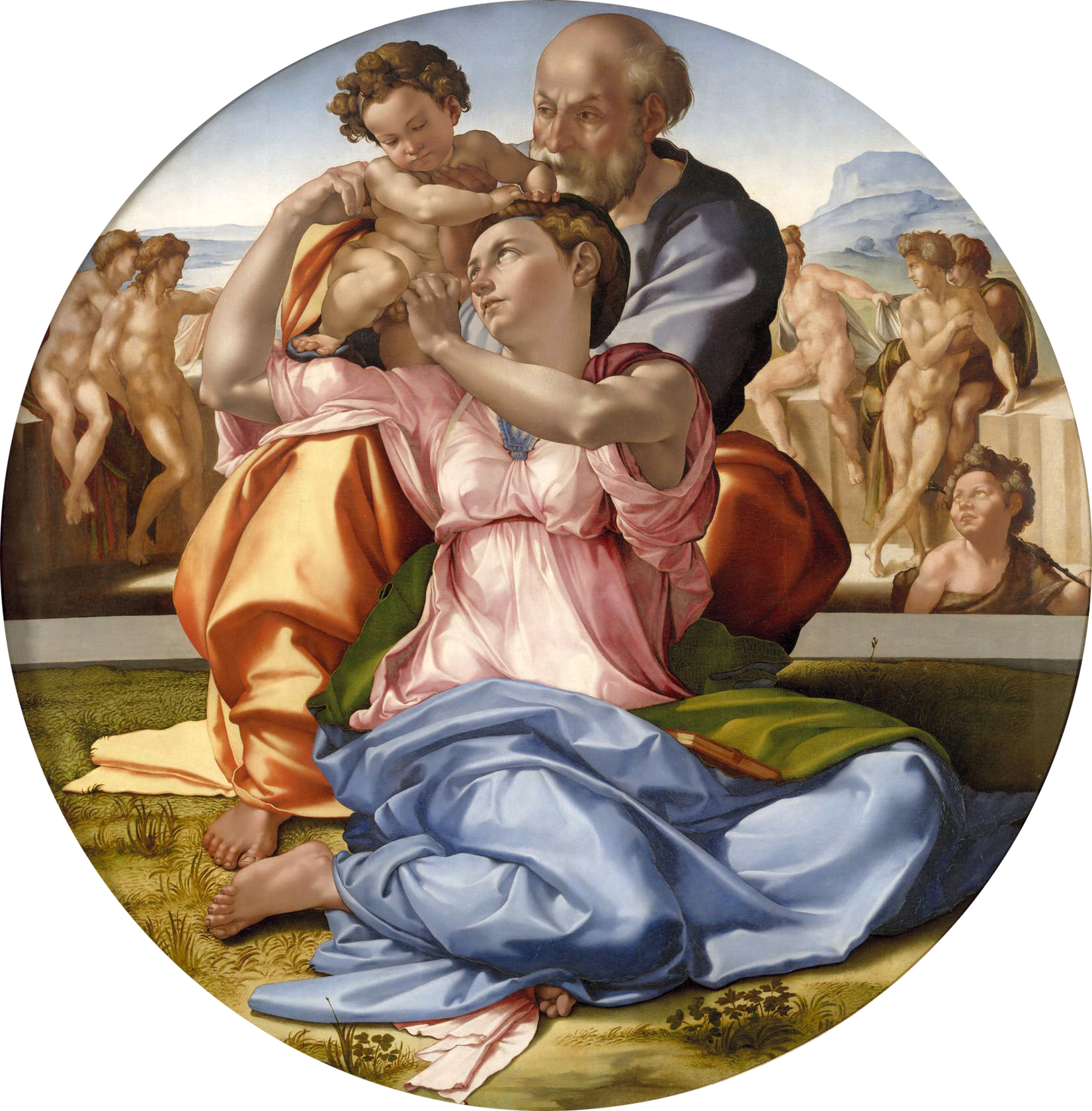
Michelangelo, Doni Tondo

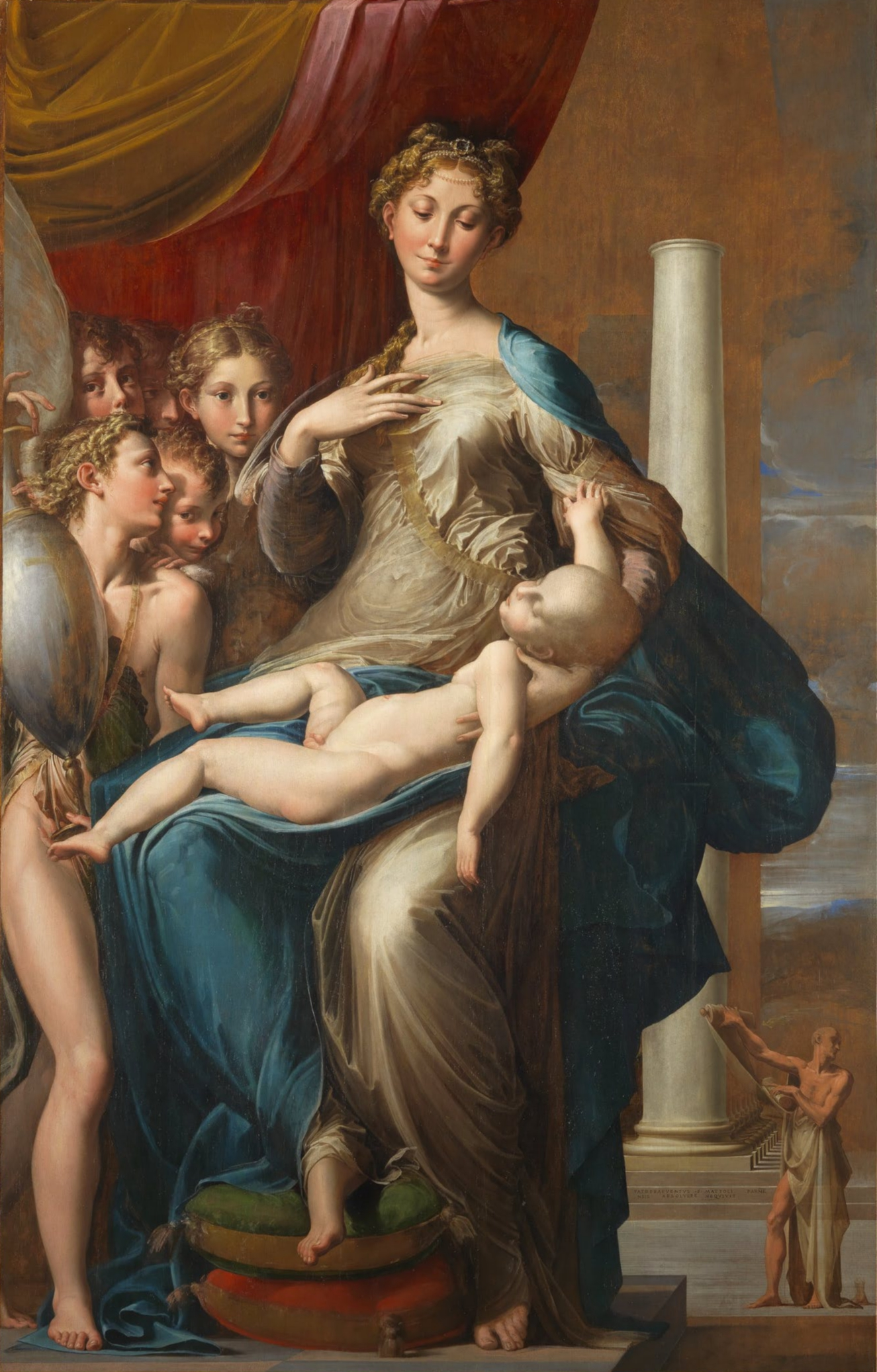
Parmigianino, The Madonna with the Long Neck

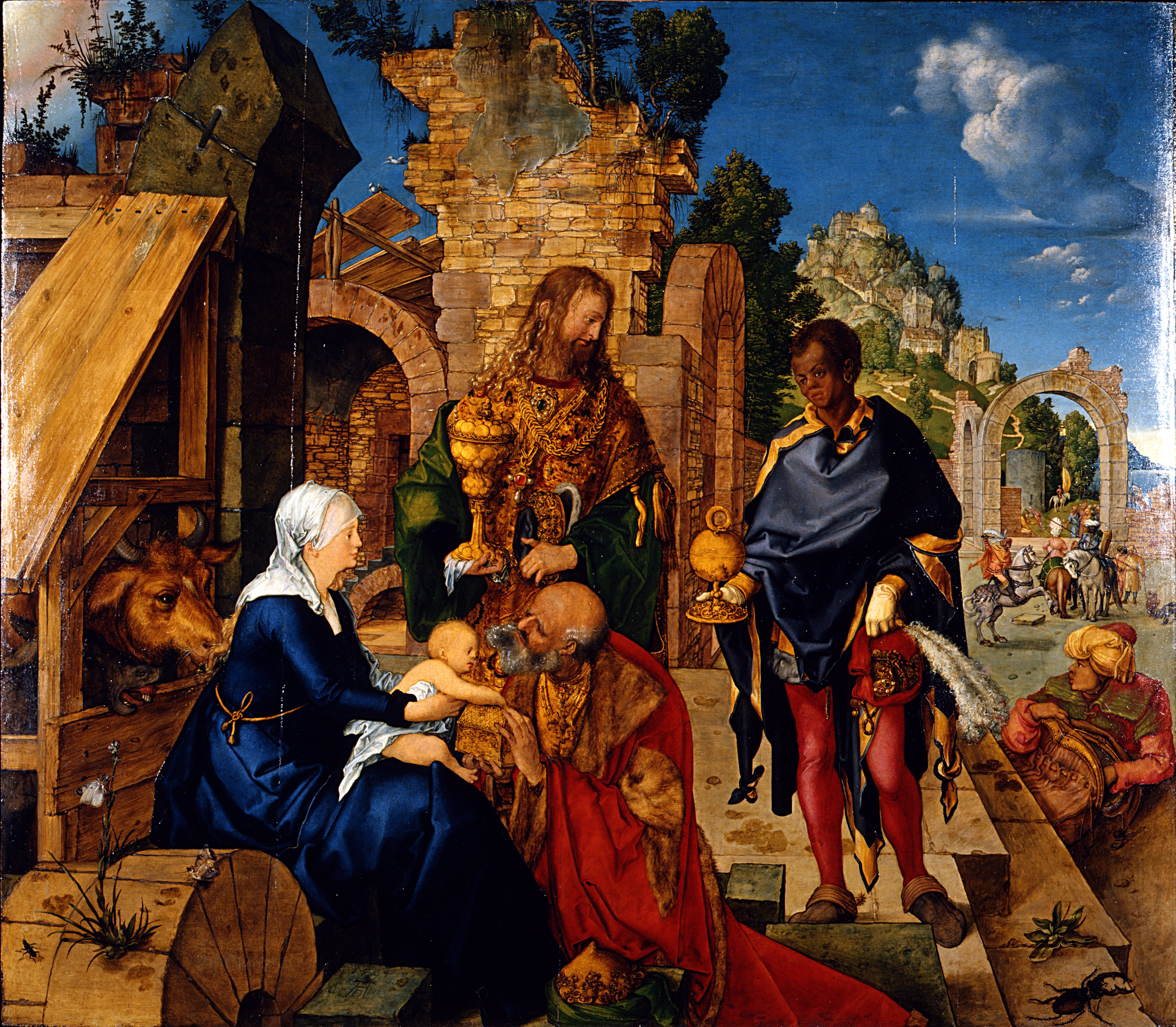
Albrecht Dürer, Adorazione dei Magi

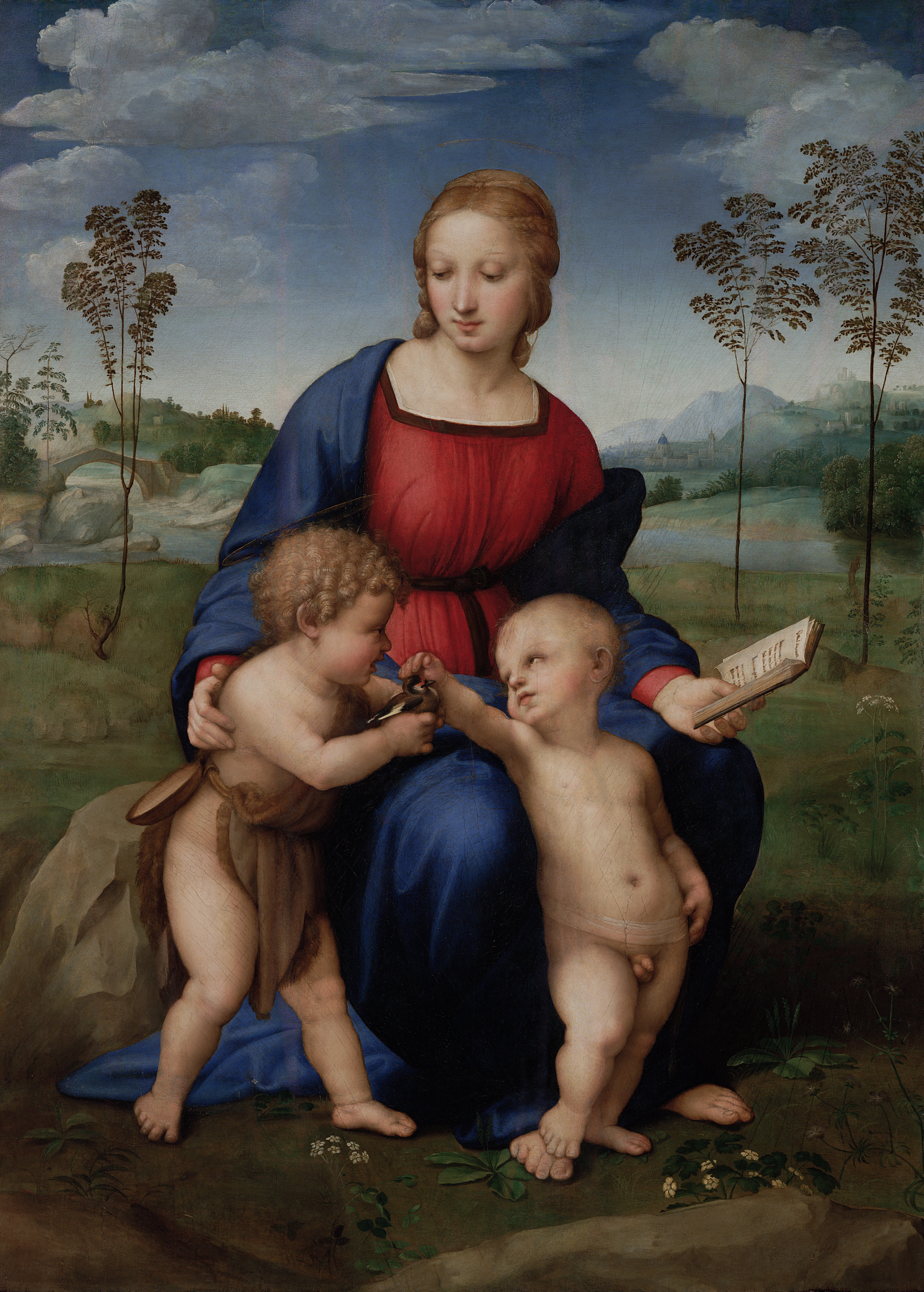
Raphael, Madonna of the Goldfinch

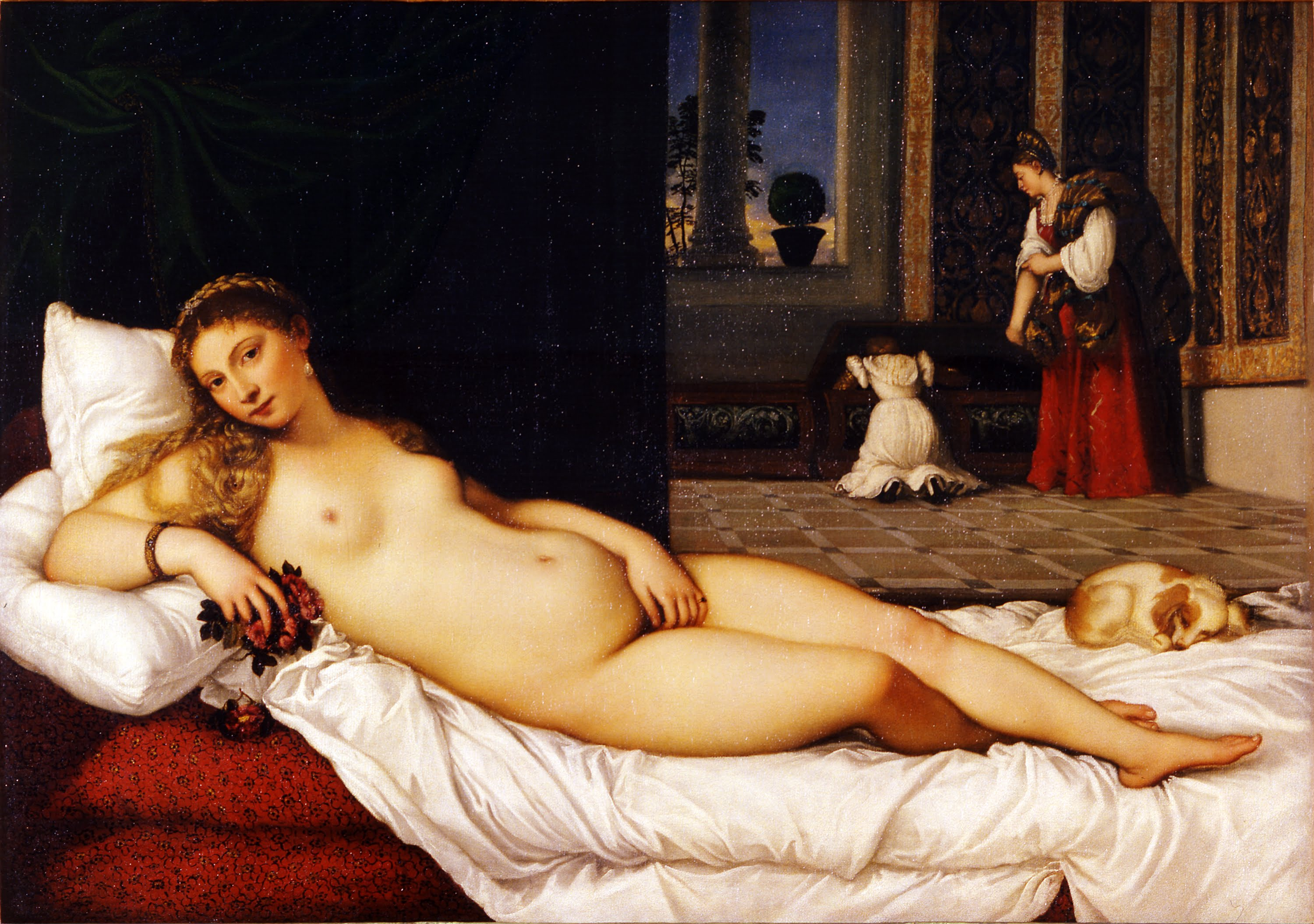
Titian, Venus of Urbino

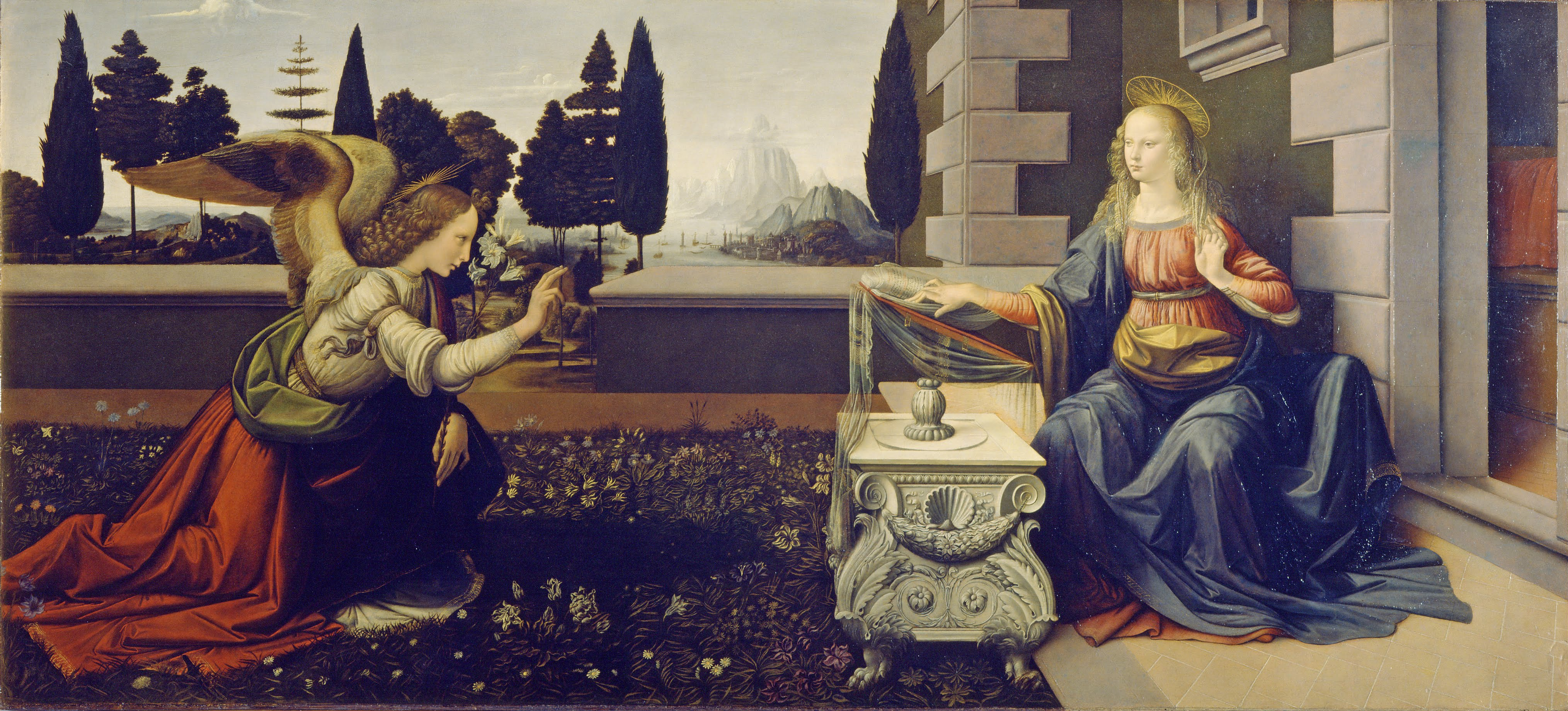
Leonardo da Vinci, Annunciation

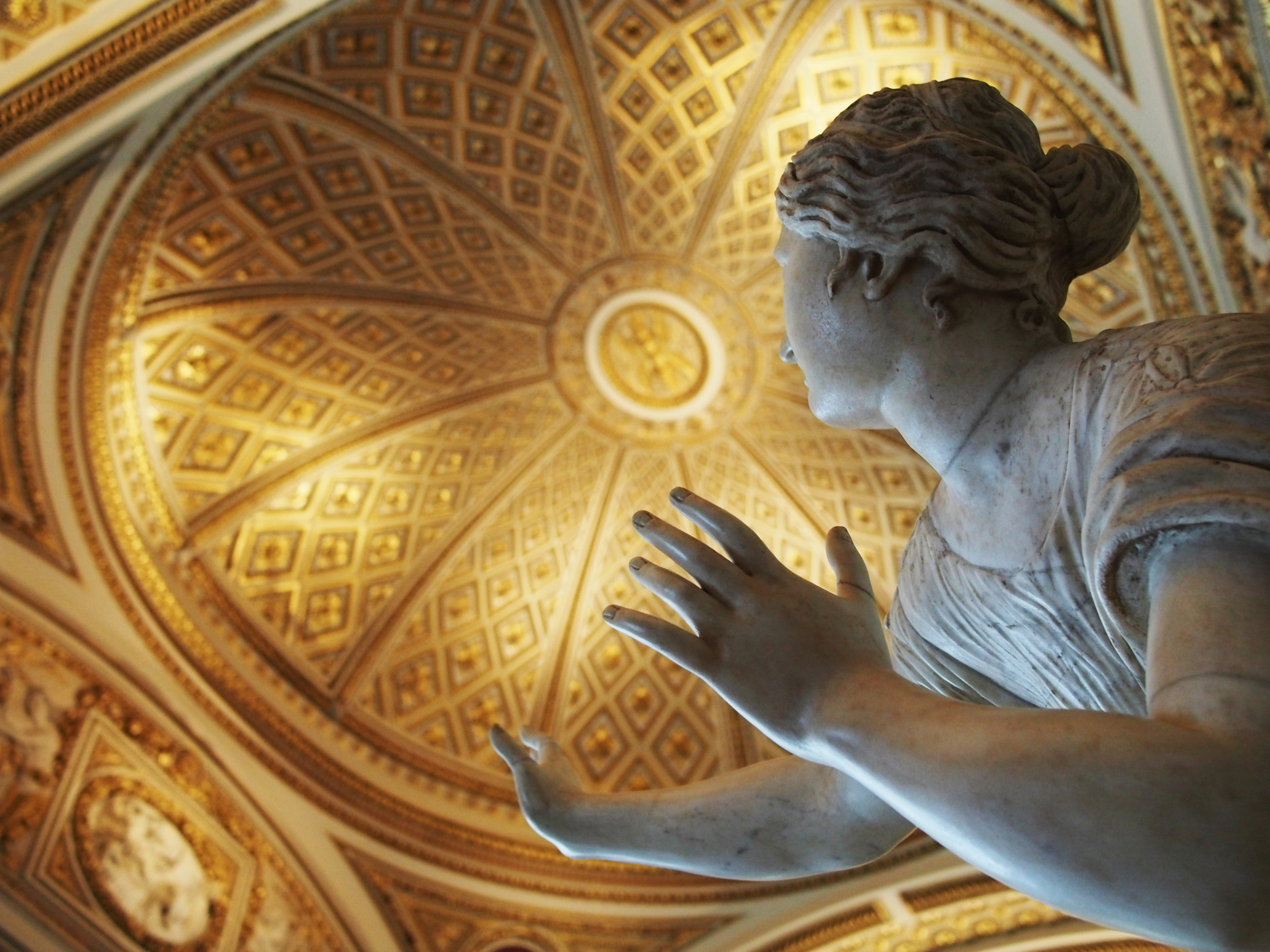
Restored Niobe room represents Roman copies of late Hellenistic art. View of the daughter of Niobe bent by terror.

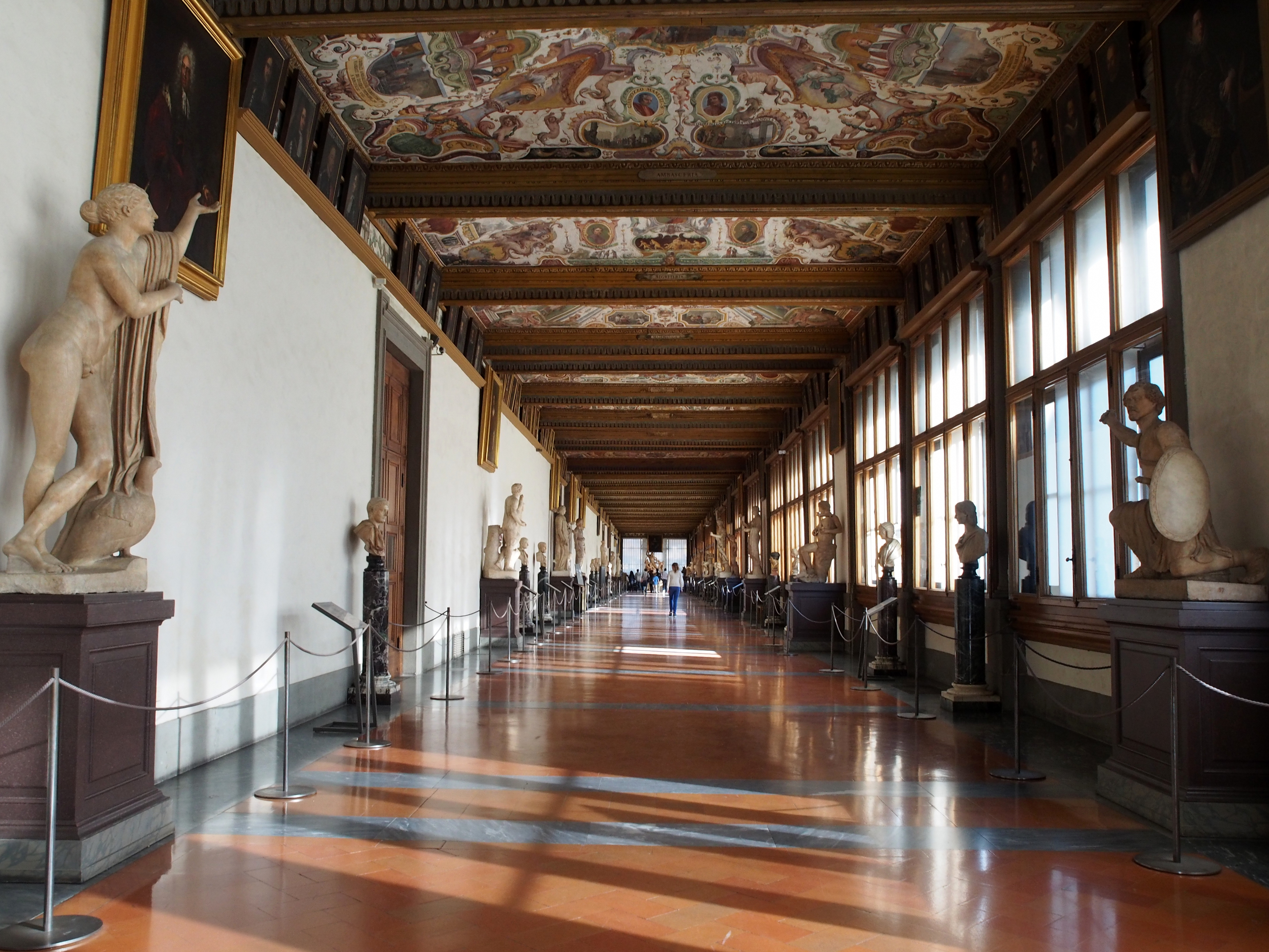
View of hallway, the walls were originally covered with tapestries.

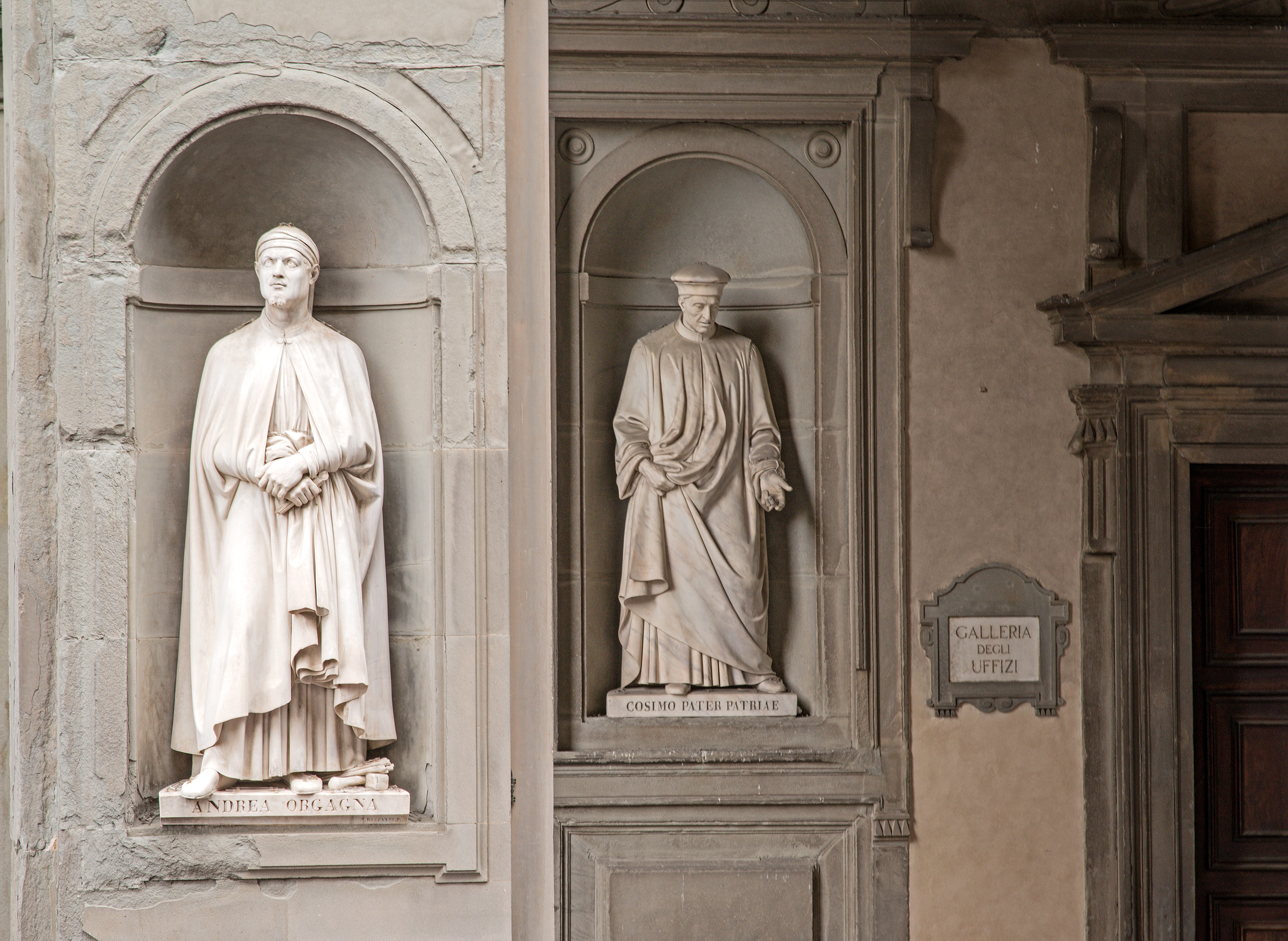
Cosimo de' Medici by Luigi Magi and Andrea Di Cione (Orcagna) by Niccolò Bazzanti

== See also ==
- List of most-visited art museums
