= 'Tronie' of a Young Man with Gorget and Beret =

Painting attributed to Rembrandt, c. 1639

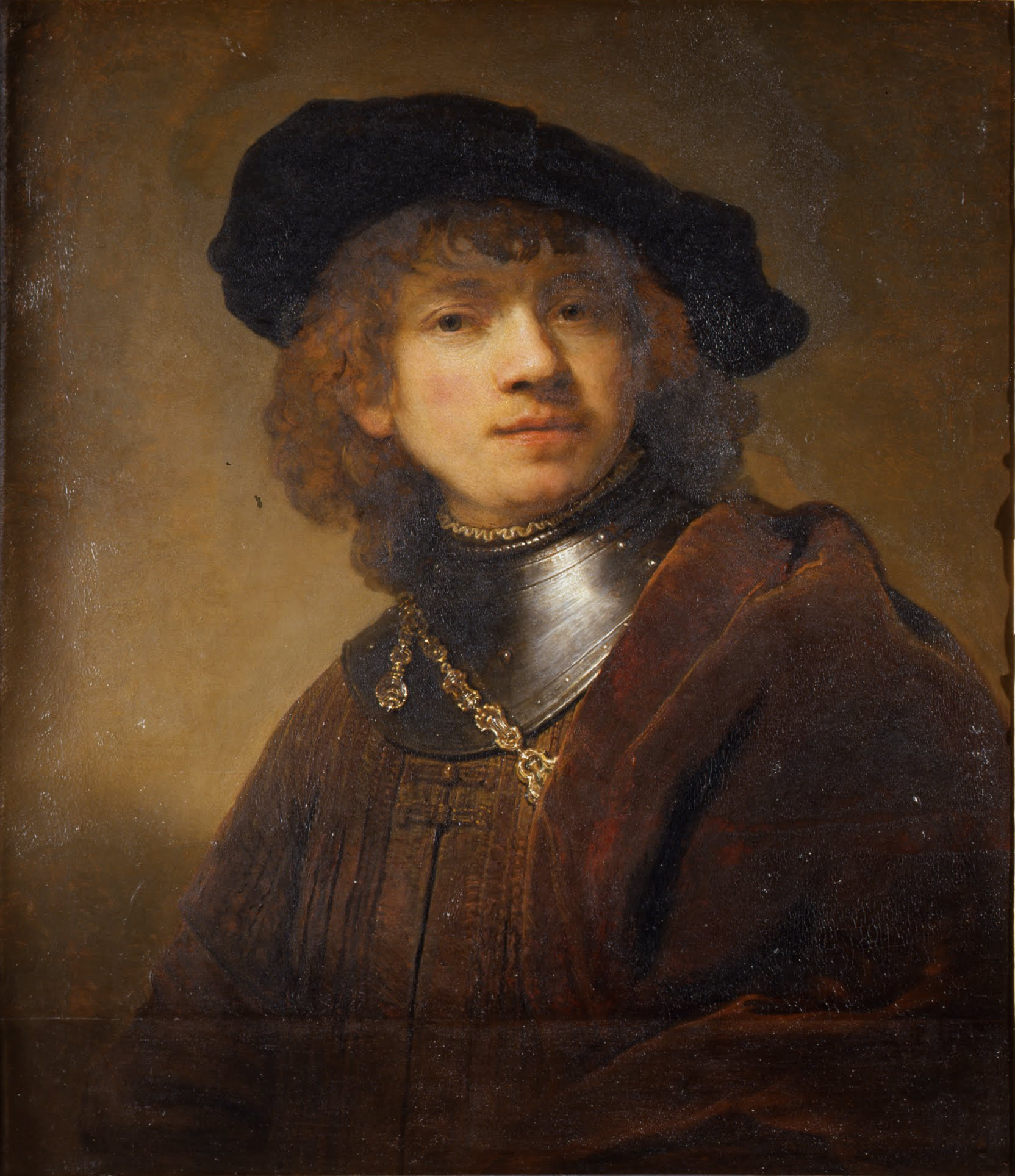
'Tronie' of a Young Man with Gorget and Beret, formerly Self-portrait as a young man, 1639–40, Uffizi, Florence

'Tronie' of a Young Man with Gorget and Beret, formerly known as Self-portrait as a young man (both with variant titles) is a tronie portrait of a young man that was traditionally regarded as one of over 40 painted self-portraits by Rembrandt. It is now in the Galleria degli Uffizi in Florence, where the most recent restoration by Daniele Rossi revealed a signature previously hidden under old varnish.

The Rembrandt Research Project and other modern scholars now doubt that it is by Rembrandt at all, although it might be an unfinished Rembrandt portrait taken over by another artist. Even more unlikely is that it is a Rembrandt self-portrait, simply on the low level of resemblance of the face to the many certain examples. It used to be dated to about 1634, on the grounds of the age of the subject, if a self-portrait, and the lack of the moustache that Rembrandt usually has for most of the 1630s. Seen in terms of Rembrandt's style alone, about 1639-40 seems more likely.

As in many of Rembrandt's actual self-portraits, the subject wears fanciful dress that suggests the 16th rather than the 17th century. The gorget was contemporary wear for a soldier, included in a number of Rembrandt's tronie self-portraits.

== Provenance ==
The painting belonged to the art-loving Johann Wilhelm, Elector Palatine ("Jan Willem", r. 1690-1716), who was married to Anna Maria Luisa de' Medici, the last of the Medici family. Johann Wilhelm had his own collection of artists' self-portraits, like his father in law. He gave the painting to the Gerini family, Florentine grandees and art patrons. It was exhibited in Florence as a Rembrandt self-portrait in 1724, and so described in the published illustrated catalogue of the Gerini collection in 1759. In the Palazzo Gerini an allegory of the arts in fresco by Giuseppe Zocchi (1711–67) shows the personification of "Painting" looking at the catalogue, held by two putti, open to the page illustrating this painting. The highly unusual rendition in fresco of a reproductive print shows the prestige the painting had. In 1818 it entered the Uffizi's famous collection of artists' self-portraits.
