= Madonna del Prato (Raphael) =

Painting by Raphael

Madonna del prato
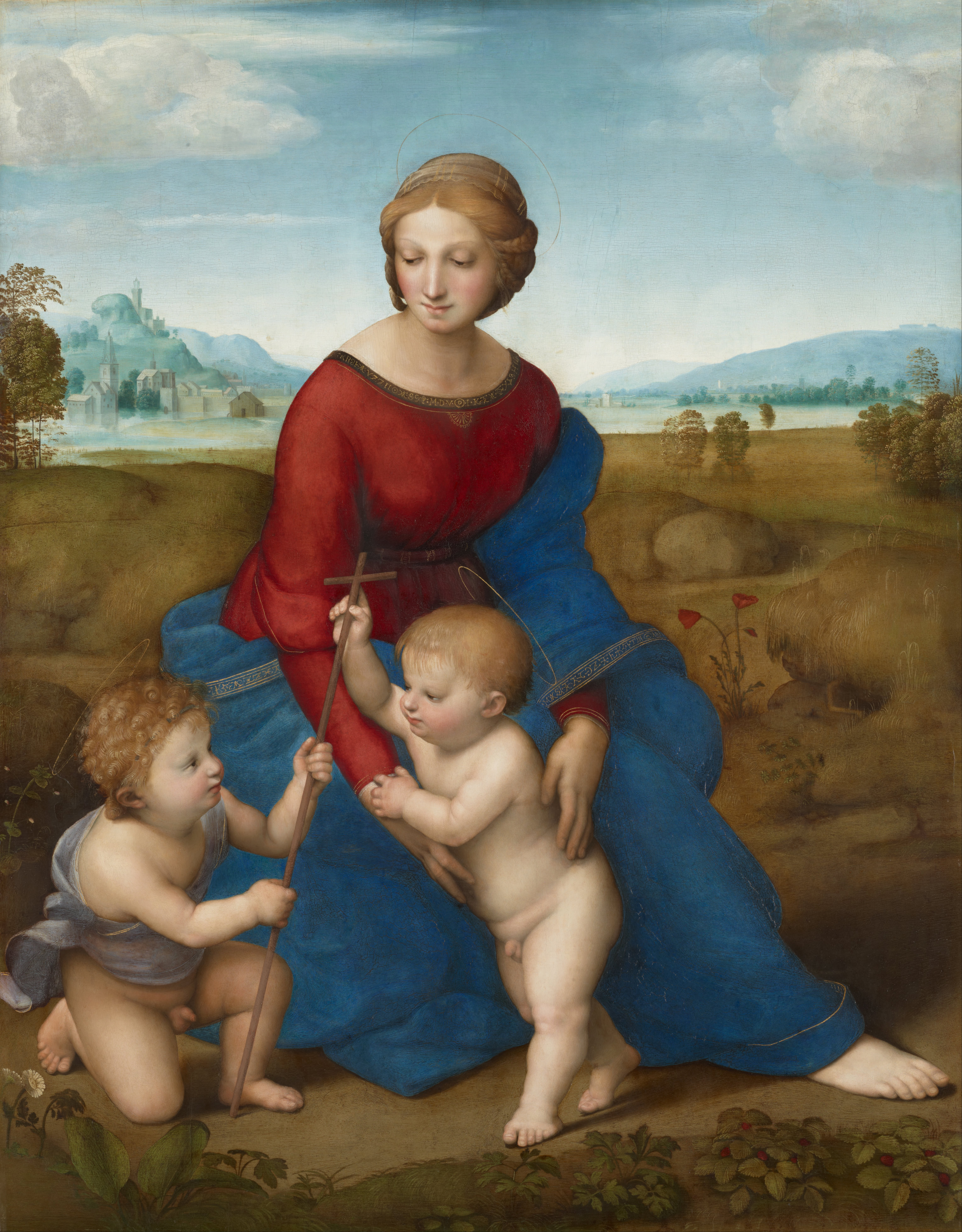
- Artist: Raphael
- Year: 1506
- Type: oil on board
- Dimensions: 113 cm × 88 cm (44 in × 35 in)
- Location: Kunsthistorisches Museum; Vienna

The Madonna del Prato (Madonna of the Meadow), formally Madonna with the Christ Child and Saint John the Baptist, is an oil on board painting by Raphael, created in 1506, now held in the Kunsthistorisches Museum in Vienna. It is also known as the Madonna del Belvedere after its long residence in the imperial collection in the Vienna Belvedere.

== Subject ==
The painting was executed by twenty-three-year-old Raphael within months of his 1504–1505 arrival in Florence. The scene represents the figures of the Virgin Mary, the infant Jesus, and an infant John the Baptist shown in a calm grassy meadow, in a pyramidal arrangement linked by their gazes. Mary is wearing a gold-bordered blue mantle set against a red dress, extending her right leg along a diagonal. The blue symbolizes the church and the red Christ's death, with the Madonna touching hands with Jesus the uniting of Mother Church with Christ's sacrifice. Her eyes fixed on John, her head turned to the left and slightly inclined, and her hands steady him as he leans forward unsteadily to touch the miniature cross held by John. The poppy refers to Christ's passion, death and resurrection. The painting depicts a peaceful, tender and idyllic moment, disturbed only by child Jesus's grabbing at the cross held by John the Baptist, which hints to the forthcoming Passion of Jesus. This kind of serene and harmonious composition was held in very high regard by Renaissance patrons and earned Raphael a commission to paint a fresco for the Pope at the Vatican stanze in Rome.

== Technique ==
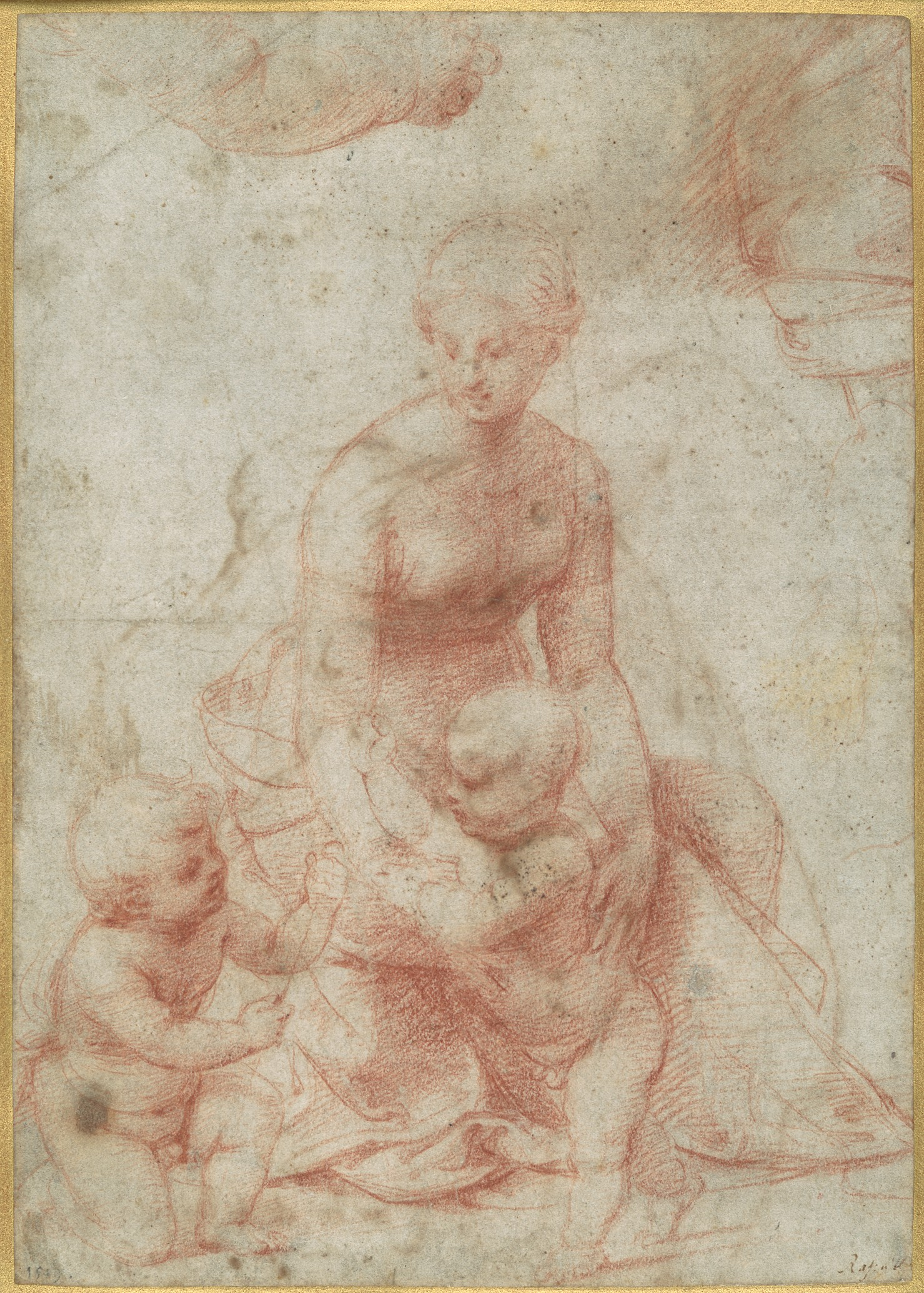
Raphael, preparatory drawing in red chalk, Metropolitan Museum of Art

For this painting, as well as in others such as the Madonna of the Goldfinch, Raphael followed the techniques of Leonardo da Vinci (who was also in Florence at the time) in blocking its subjects in pyramidal form; this can be observed in such works as Leonardo's Virgin of the Rocks. A red-chalk composition study, one of many preparatory drawings for the painting made by Raphael, is in the Metropolitan Museum of Art. (Note: On its verso is an anatomically correct male, possibly a study for one of the thieves next to Jesus in a descent from the cross.)

In 1983, the Chief Conservator for Paintings at the Kunsthistorisches Museum in Vienna removed the retouchings and varnish that deformed the Madonna of the Meadow. Restoration revealed that this painting's structure is similar to that of the Small Cowper Madonna, and consists of translucent oil glazes, opaque underpaint and gesso ground. Furthermore, the observed damages were caused by the same factors, namely Raphael's painting technique in the robe and mantle. In the Madonna of the Meadow, the blue robe is disfigured by a wide craquelure provoked by the uneven drying of the oil layers. Additionally, the painting is characterized by a great depth of shadows and a subtle interplay of the cool and warm tones that model the flesh. A bluish undertone, visible in the shadows and edges of the panel, underlies the creamy white and pink of the flesh. Moreover, close examination of the work suggests that the sky was painted after the figures were executed, since the blue brush strokes appear to follow the contours of the figures and are perceptible not only on the surface but also in x-radiographs. When examined using infra-red techniques, the Madonna of the Meadow also betrays an underdrawing, completed when the design was transferred onto the panel; the marks left by this transfer are clear, and the lines that connect them are precise, illuminating the artist's process.

== See also ==
- List of paintings by Raphael
- 100 Great Paintings, 1980 BBC series
