= Marcia Hall =

American art historian

Marcia Hall (born 1939), who usually publishes as Marcia B. Hall, is an American art historian and the emeritus Laura H. Carnell Professor of Renaissance Art History at the Tyler School of Art and Architecture of Temple University in Philadelphia. Hall's scholarship concentrates on Italian Renaissance painting, mostly of the sixteenth century, especially Raphael and Michelangelo.

== Biography ==
Marcia Brown was born in Washington, D.C. in 1939 to Charles Edward Brown, a business executive, and Frances Peebles.

She attended Wellesley College, graduating in 1960. In 1961 she married Charles Arthur Mann Hall, then the dean of Wellesley's chapel. She earned an MA from Radcliffe College in 1962 and won a Fulbright Fellowship in 1963 to research her dissertation on the late 16th century renovations to Santa Maria Novella and Santa Croce, supervised by Sydney Joseph Freedberg at Harvard University. She was the first scholar to discover the rood screen in both churches once removed by Giorgio Vasari during the Counter-Reformation. She earned her PhD from Harvard in 1967. She has been teaching art history class relates to Italian Renaissance at Temple University since 1973.

Her visiting fellowships include the Institute for Advanced Study, the Center for Advanced Study in the Visual Arts at the National Gallery of Art and Villa I Tatti.

== Works ==
- 1979. Renovation and Counter-Reformation: Vasari and Duke Cosimo in Santa Maria Novella and Santa Croce, 1565–77. New York: Oxford University Press.
- 1990. After Raphael: Painting in Central Italy in the Sixteenth Century. Cambridge University Press.
- 1992. Color and Meaning: Practice and Theory in Renaissance Painting. Cambridge University Press.
- 2002. Michelangelo. The Frescoes of the Sistine Chapel. New York: Harry N. Abrams.
- 2005. The Cambridge Companion to Raphael (ed.). Cambridge University Press.
- 2011. The Sacred Image in the Age of Art: Titian, Tintoretto, Barocci, El Greco, Caravaggio. Yale University Press.
- 2019. The Power of Color: Five Centuries of European Painting. New Haven: Yale University Press.
