= Bacchus (Leonardo) =

Painting attributed to Leonardo da Vinci

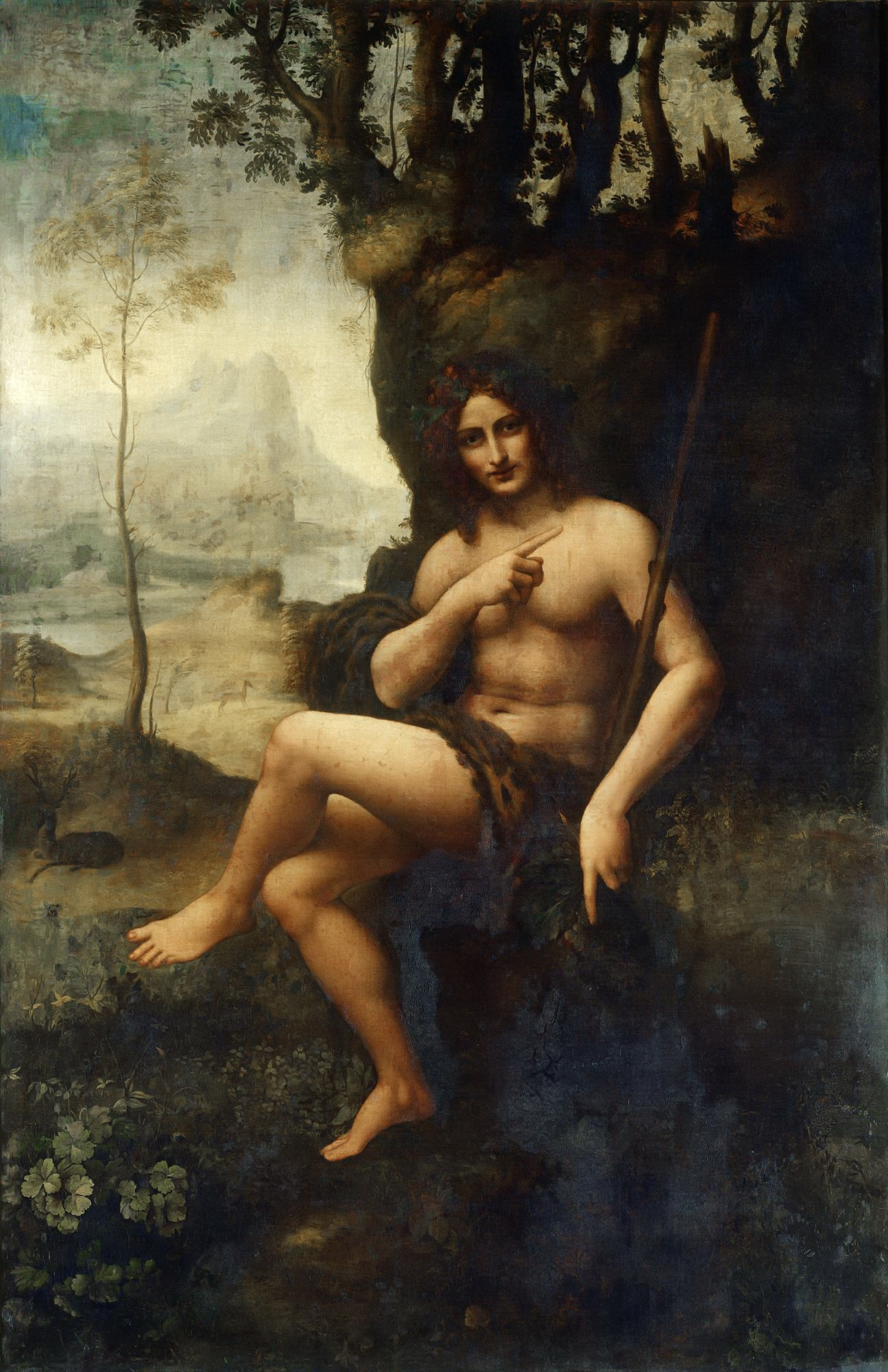
- Artist: Francesco Melzi, Workshop of Leonardo da Vinci
- Year: 1510–1515
- Type: Oil on walnut panel transferred to canvas
- Dimensions: 177 cm × 115 cm (70 in × 45 in)
- Location: Louvre; Paris

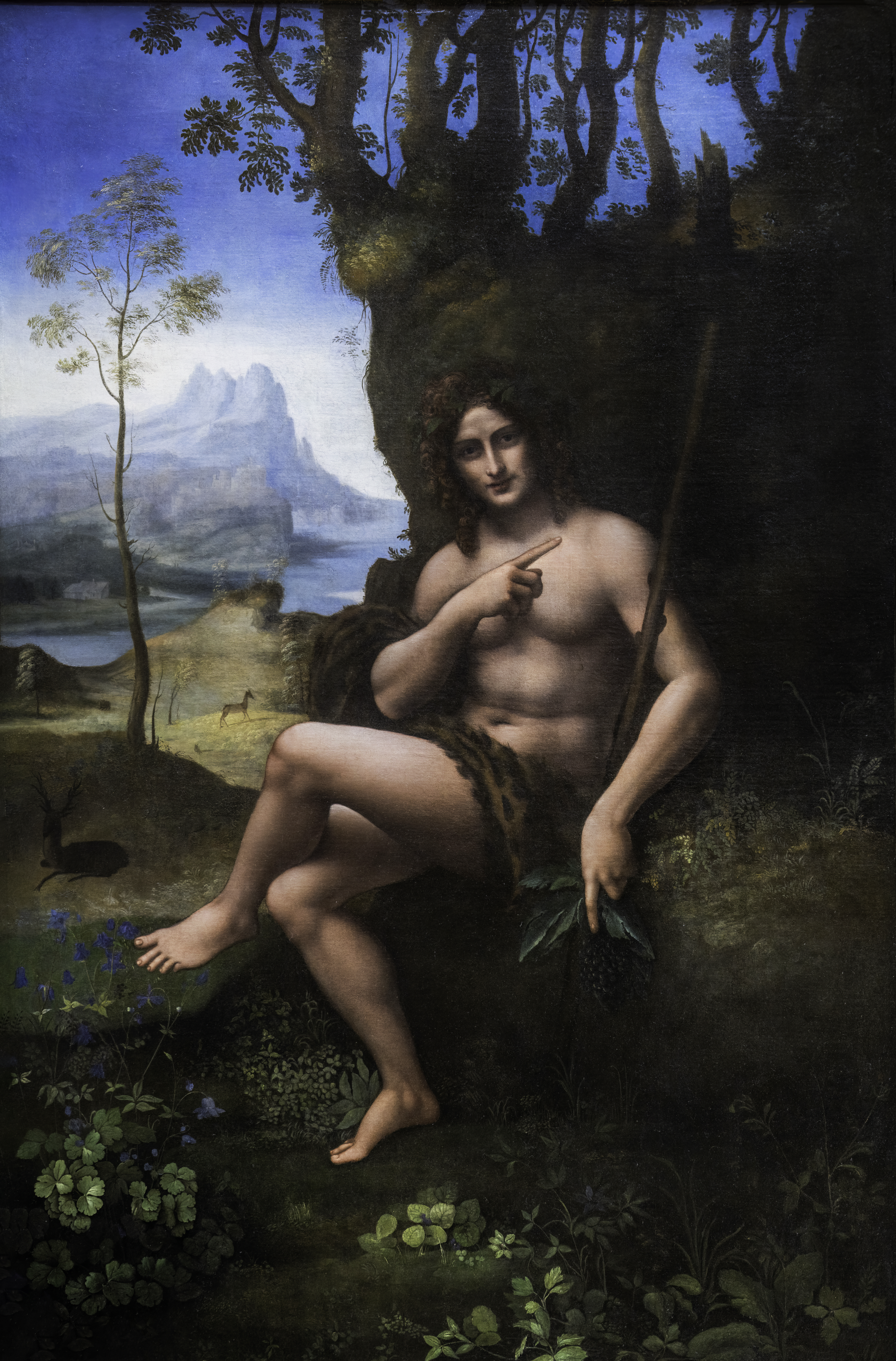
Bacchus is seen here after recent restoration work. Colors closer to original and details are better visible again.

Bacchus, originally Saint John the Baptist, is a painting in the Musée du Louvre, Paris, France, by the Italian Renaissance artist Leonardo da Vinci and Francesco Melzi, while in Leonardo's workshop. Sydney J. Freedberg assigns the drawing to Leonardo's second Milan period. Among the Lombard painters who have been suggested as possible authors are Cesare da Sesto, (Note: Cesare is most often credited with the best of three copies of this work in its original formulation, on loan to the National Gallery of Scotland.) Marco d'Oggiono, Francesco Melzi, and Cesare Bernazzano. The painting shows a male figure with garlanded head and leopard skin loincloth, seated in an idyllic landscape. He points with his right hand off to his left, and with his left hand grasps his thyrsus and also points down to earth.

The painting originally depicted John the Baptist. In the late 17th century, between the years 1683 and 1693, it was overpainted and altered to serve as Bacchus. (Note: It was inventoried in 1683 at Saint Jean dans le désert at Fontainebleau and in 1693 at Meudon as Bacchus, with a marginal note that it had been previously inventoried as Saint John. (Freedberg 1982:285, note 16).)

The model for the John the Baptist / Bacchus / Angelo incarnato series was Salaì.

Cassiano dal Pozzo remarked of the painting in its former state, which he saw at Fontainebleau in 1625, that it had neither devotion, decorum nor similitude, the suavely beautiful, youthful and slightly androgynous Giovannino was so at variance with artistic conventions in portraying the Baptist – neither the older ascetic prophet nor the Florentine baby Giovannino, but a type of Leonardo's invention, of a disconcerting, somewhat ambiguous sensuality, familiar in Leonardo's half-length and upward-pointing Saint John the Baptist, also in the Louvre.

The overpainting transformed the image of St. John into one of a pagan deity, by converting the long-handled cross-like staff of the Baptist to a Bacchic thyrsus and adding a vine wreath. The fur robe is the legacy of John the Baptist, but has been overpainted with leopard-spots relating, like the wreath, to Bacchus, the Roman god of wine and intoxication.

== Copies ==
Few copies done by Leonardeschi artists are known. One of them is attributed to Bernardino Lanino (panel, 24 x 24 cm) and is held at the National Gallery of Scotland, Edinburgh. It depicts St John the Baptist in Wilderness. However, the saint is placed to a background of grotto with some sight of high rocks, a river, riders and a hanged man. Another copy of 15th-16th centuries is held at Musee Ingres, Montauban. Another copy, attributed to follower of Cesare da Sesto was sold in auction at Christie's on 23 April 2008.
