= Male Mona Lisa theories =

Speculations that the Mona Lisa depicts a male figure

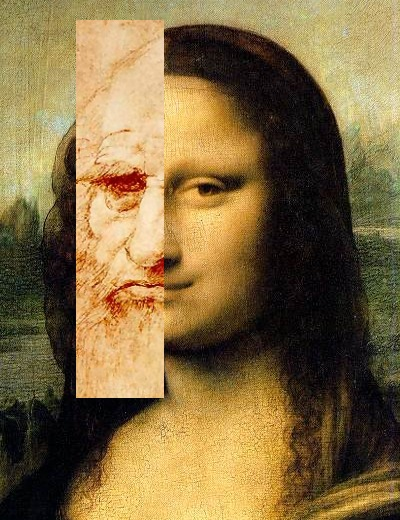
Overlay of Leonardo's supposed self-portrait onto the Mona Lisa, done by Lillian Schwartz

There are two theories revolving around the Mona Lisa by Leonardo da Vinci which postulate that the subject of the painting was actually a man. Leonardo is known for having a number of conspiracy theories formed around his life and his art, and the Mona Lisa has attracted an especially high number of these. Many of the theories surrounding the Mona Lisa stem from how art historians have still not conclusively determined the sitter's identity. The commonly accepted explanation is that she was Lisa Gherardini, the wife of a silk merchant from Florence named Francesco del Giocondo; however, without irrefutable proof there are still an array of alternative theories.

While many theories uphold the assumption that the model for the Mona Lisa was a woman, there are two theories which propose that the sitter may have been a man in drag. One theory is that the model for the portrait was Leonardo's longtime apprentice and suspected lover, Gian Giacomo Caprotti, also known by the nickname Salai. The other theory is that the Mona Lisa is a self-portrait of Leonardo as a woman. Neither of these theories are well received by most art historians.

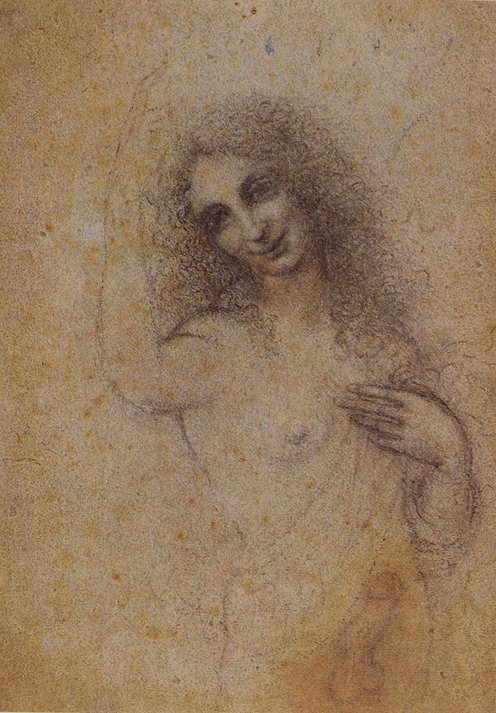
Angelo Incarnato, a drawing attributed to Leonardo believed to depict Salai

== Salai ==
The theory that the Mona Lisa was modeled on Leonardo's suspected lover Salai is most staunchly championed by Silvano Vincenti, head of the National Committee for Cultural Heritage. Vincenti reported that he had used infrared technology to find earlier draft layers hidden underneath the Mona Lisa. Vincenti then compared the underlayers to several other paintings that Salai is widely believed to have posed for, including Saint John the Baptist and the Angelo Incarnato. According to Vincenti, the features of the Mona Lisa that most resemble Salai are the nose, forehead, and smile.

Salai was Leonardo's longtime apprentice and friend, starting in 1490 when he was ten years and remaining at the workshop for two decades; he is widely rumored to have been intimately involved with Leonardo. Vincenti cites Leonardo's fascination with androgyny as a reason why the master may have painted Salai as a woman. This claim is strengthened by how Salai is purported to have cross-dressed repeatedly. The theory that the Mona Lisa was Salai has been brought up and refuted multiple times before.

== Self-portrait of Leonardo ==
The theory that the Mona Lisa was a self-portrait by Leonardo was first proposed in 1987 by Lillian Schwartz, an artist and computer technician. Schwartz noted the similarities in the shapes of the facial features of the painting with those of the drawing popularly believed to be a self-portrait of Leonardo, and theorized that the Mona Lisa may have been a self-portrait in drag. Supporters of this theory cite Leonardo's love of riddles as motivation for him to paint himself as a woman. The self-portrait theory is widely held in low regard among Leonardo experts.
