= Saint John the Baptist (Leonardo) =

Painting by Leonardo da Vinci

- Artist: Leonardo da Vinci
- Year: 1513–1516
- Medium: Oil on walnut wood
- Dimensions: 69 cm × 57 cm (27.16 in × 22.44 in)
- Location: Louvre; Paris

Saint John the Baptist is a High Renaissance oil painting on walnut wood by Leonardo da Vinci. Likely to have been completed between 1513 and 1516, it is believed to be his final painting. Its original size was 69 by 57 centimetres (27 in × 22 in).

The painting is in the permanent collection of the Louvre. In November 2022, it was loaned to Louvre Abu Dhabi for two years as part of the museum's fifth anniversary.

== Subject matter ==
The work depicts the figure of John the Baptist in isolation through the use of chiaroscuro, with the figure appearing to emerge from the shadowy background. The saint is dressed in furs, has long curly hair and is smiling in an enigmatic manner reminiscent of Leonardo's famous Mona Lisa. He holds a reed cross in his left hand, while his right hand points up toward heaven, similar to the figure of Saint Anne in Leonardo's Burlington House Cartoon. According to Frank Zöllner, Leonardo's use of sfumato "conveys the religious content of the picture", with the "gentle shadows [imbuing] the subject's skin tones with a very soft, delicate appearance, almost androgynous in its effect".

Kenneth Clark claimed that for Leonardo, Saint John represented "the eternal question mark, the enigma of creation", and noted the sense of "uneasiness" that the painting imbues. Barolsky adds that: "Describing Saint John emerging from the darkness in almost shockingly immediate relation to the beholder, Leonardo magnifies the very ambiguity between spirit and flesh. The grace of Leonardo's figure, which has a disturbingly erotic charge, nonetheless conveys a spiritual meaning to which Saint John refers when he speaks of the fullness of grace from God."

The model for the John the Baptist / Bacchus / Angelo incarnato series was Salaì.

== Dating ==
The dating of Saint John the Baptist is disputed. It was seen by Antonio de Beatis in Leonardo's workshop at Clos Lucé; his diary entry giving a terminus ante quem of 17 October 1517.

Traditionally, the painting has been considered the artist's last, and has been dated to 1513–1516; Leonardo's sfumato technique here being considered to have reached its apogee. Some experts, however, have compared the hand of Saint John to a similar work by a pupil in the Codex Atlanticus, dating the commencement of the picture to around 1509. The pose is also similar to that of a sculpture of the same subject completed after 1510 for the Florence Baptistery by Giovanni Francesco Rustici. Leonardo is thought to have given Rustici technical advice for his commission; it is possible that one artist could have influenced the other with the idea for the pose.

== Provenance ==
Saint John the Baptist was apparently part of the French king Francis I's collection at Fontainebleau in 1542. In 1625, King Charles I of England received the painting from Louis XIII of France in return for a Titian – the Holy Family – and Hans Holbein's Portrait of Erasmus. In 1649, Charles's collection was sold, whereupon the painting entered into the hands of the banker Eberhard Jabach. After a spell in the possession of Cardinal Mazarin, in 1661 the work once again returned to the King of France – Louis XIV. Following the French Revolution, the painting entered the collection at the Louvre, where it remains to this day.

== Influence ==
Prior to this work, Saint John had traditionally been portrayed as a gaunt ascetic. Leonardo's innovative depiction proved influential upon Raphael's workshop; several portraits of Saint John painted around 1517–1518 attributed to Raphael and Giulio Romano show a similarly youthful saint in isolation, with a strong contrast between the dark background and the illumination of the figure.

Also numerous copies and variations of Saint John the Baptist made by Leonardeschi exist.

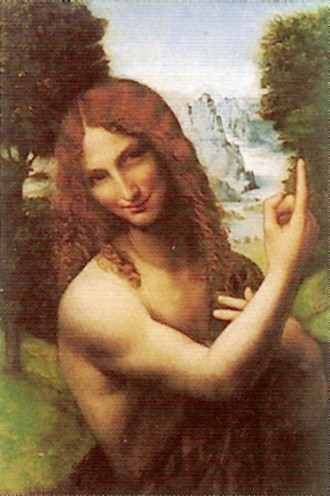
John the Baptist – Salaì

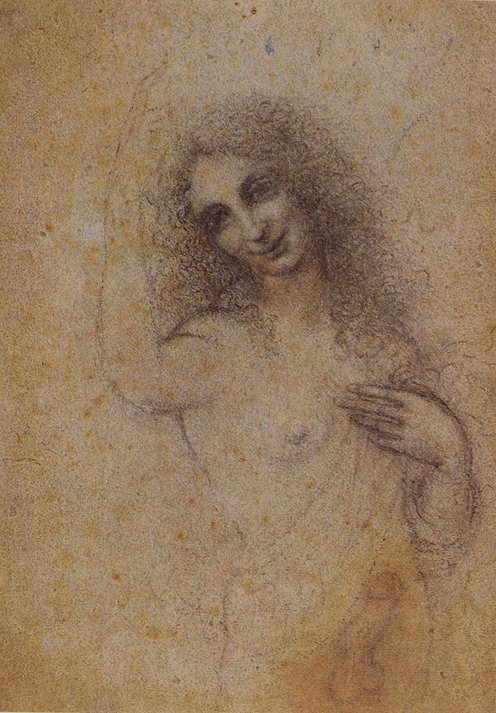
Angelo Incarnato, drawing of Salaì by Leonardo, from a folio of Leonardo's, c. 1515

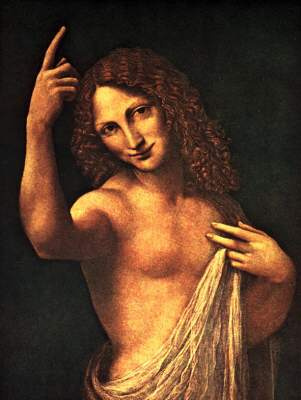
Angel of Annunciation – Bernardino Luini

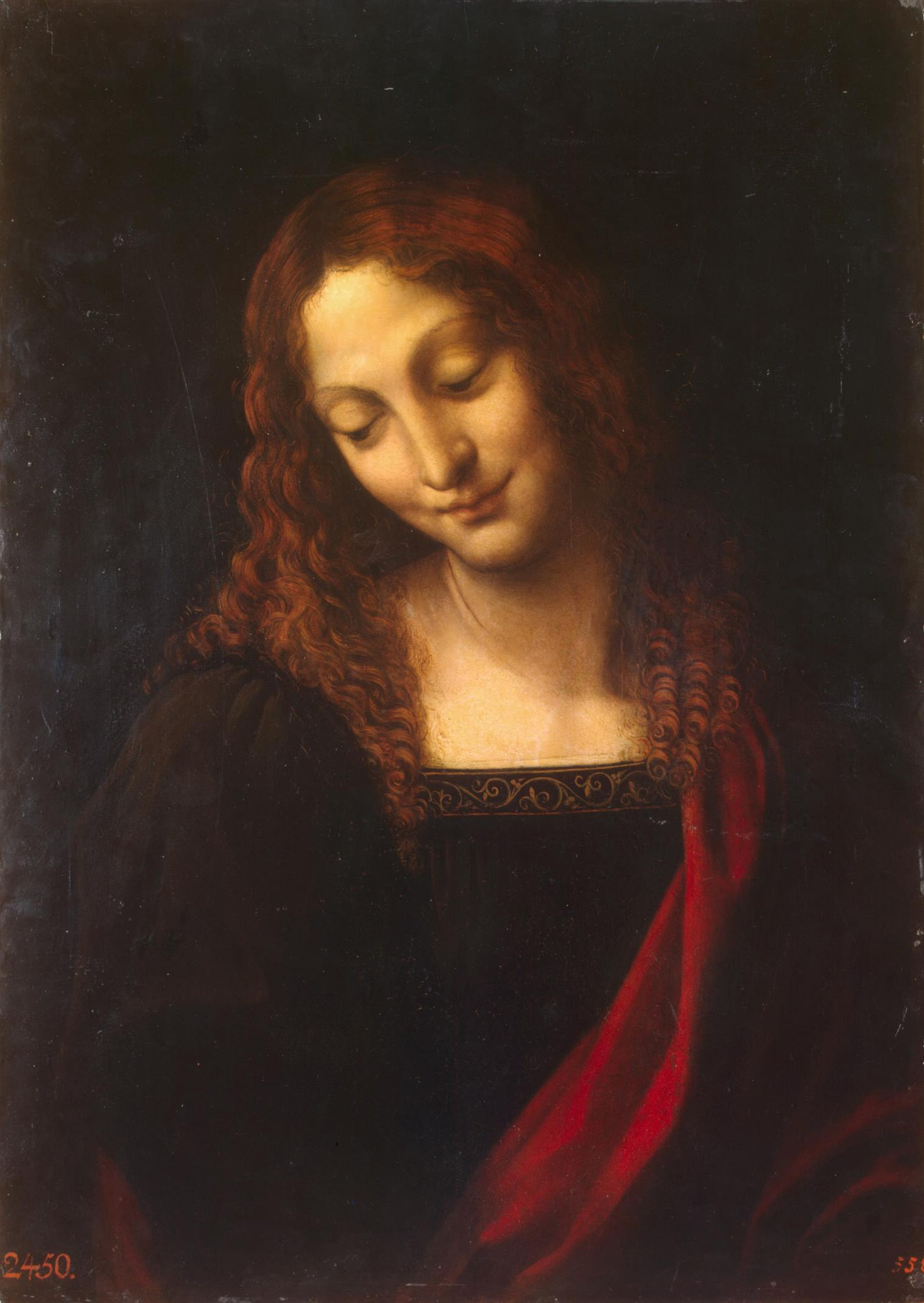
Saint John – Giampietrino

== See also ==
- List of works by Leonardo da Vinci
