= Leonardeschi =

Group of artists who worked under the influence of Leonardo da Vinci

The Leonardeschi was the large group of artists who worked in the studio of, or under the influence of, Leonardo da Vinci. They were artists of Italian Renaissance painting, although his influence extended to many countries within Europe.

As a teenager, Leonardo was enrolled as an apprentice in the studio of Andrea del Verrocchio in Florence by his father, Ser Piero di Antonio di Ser Piero di Ser Guido da Vinci, a wealthy notary. In 1472, Leonardo joined the Guild of St Luke and eventually, he qualified as a master by this important guild. Leonardo left the studio of del Verrocchio in late 1477 as an independent artist, working on commissions. Leonardo continued to live in the same quarters as del Verrocchio, however, and they collaborated on some projects. Leonardo's father enabled him to set up his own studio.

In 1482, Leonardo visited Milan where he stayed with Giovanni Ambrogio de Predis, Evangelista de Predis, and their four brothers, all of whom were artists of different kinds. Both Ambrogio and Evangelista are known for having collaborated with Leonardo in the painting of the Virgin of the Rocks for the altarpiece in the chapel of the Confraternity of the Immaculate Conception at the Church of San Francesco Grande in Milan.

In 1490, Leonardo earned recognition and a breakthrough at the court of Ludovico Sforza, and because of the scale of works commissioned he was permitted to have assistants and pupils in his own studio.

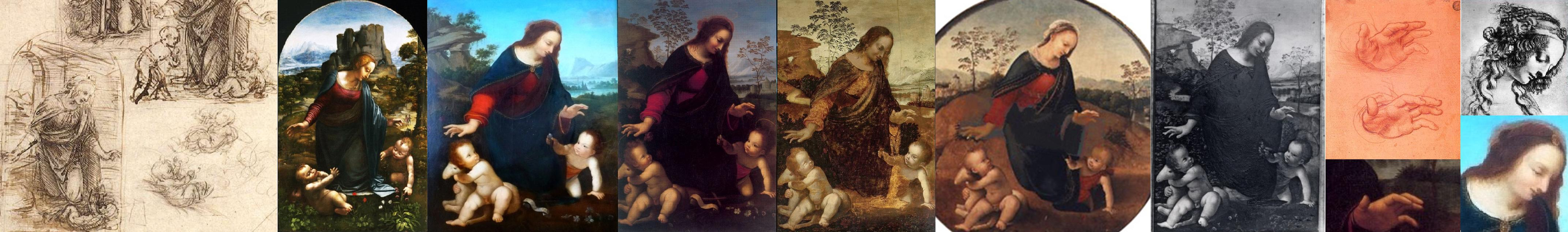
Drawings of the Madonna and Child with the Infant Saint John the Baptist by Leonardo da Vinci and paintings by various followers: Salaì, Cesare da Sesto, Fernando Yáñez de la Almedina, and Anonymous

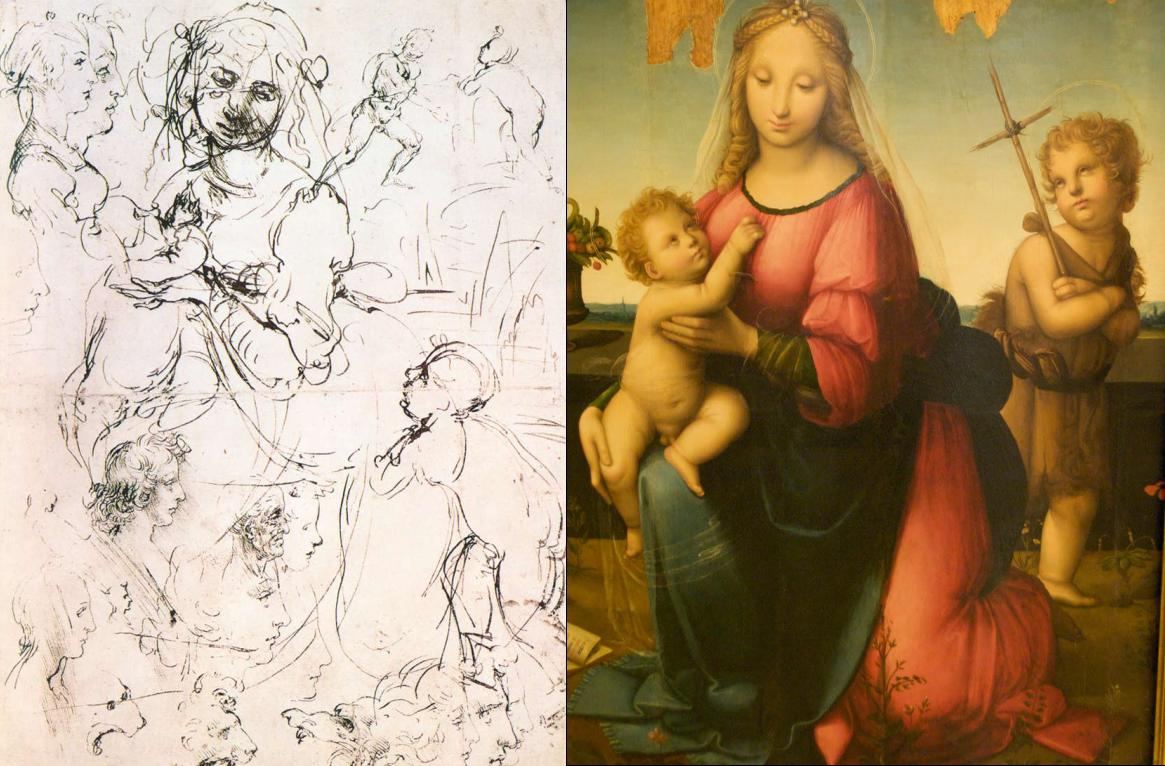
This sketch by Leonardo, held in the Royal Library, Windsor, influenced Madonna by Andrea del Brescianino, held in Naples

== Milan ==
Among Leonardo's pupils at this time were Giovanni Antonio Boltraffio, Ambrogio de Predis, Bernardino de' Conti, Francesco Napoletano, Andrea Solario, Marco d'Oggiono, and Salaì (also known as Giacomo Caprotti or Andrea Salaino). In a letter to Ludovico in 1496 Leonardo claimed that he was having to maintain six people at the time. Along with these original pupils, during his second stay in Milan in 1508 Leonardo had relationships with other Milanese artists, such as Il Sodoma (Giovanni Antonio Bazzi), Giovanni Francesco Rustici, and young Francesco Melzi, whose parents had a manor house at Vaprio, Milan. Such artists as Giampietrino, Bernardino Lanino, Cesare da Sesto, Cesare Magni, Martino Piazza da Lodi, and Bernardino Luini are also regarded as members of the circle of Leonardo, while Giovanni Antonio Boltraffio, Marco d'Oggiono, Giampietrino and Cesare da Sesto are represented as pupils in the monument to Leonardo by sculptor Pietro Magni (1872) in Piazza della Scala, Milan.

== Spain ==
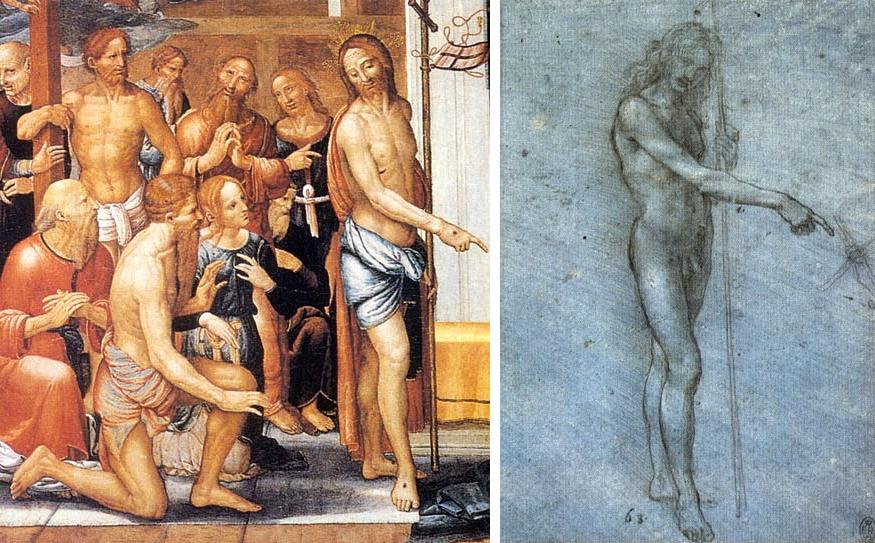
Christ Resurrected (Cathedral of Valencia) by Fernando Yáñez de la Almedina and a drawing by Leonardo da Vinci of St. John the Baptist (Windsor Royal Collection)

During the first decades of the sixteenth century a number of Spanish painters visited Florence. Fernando Yáñez de la Almedina and Hernando de los Llanos are documented as collaborators with Leonardo on The Battle of Anghiari. Both artists continued their artistic association upon returning to Spain.

== Northern Europe ==
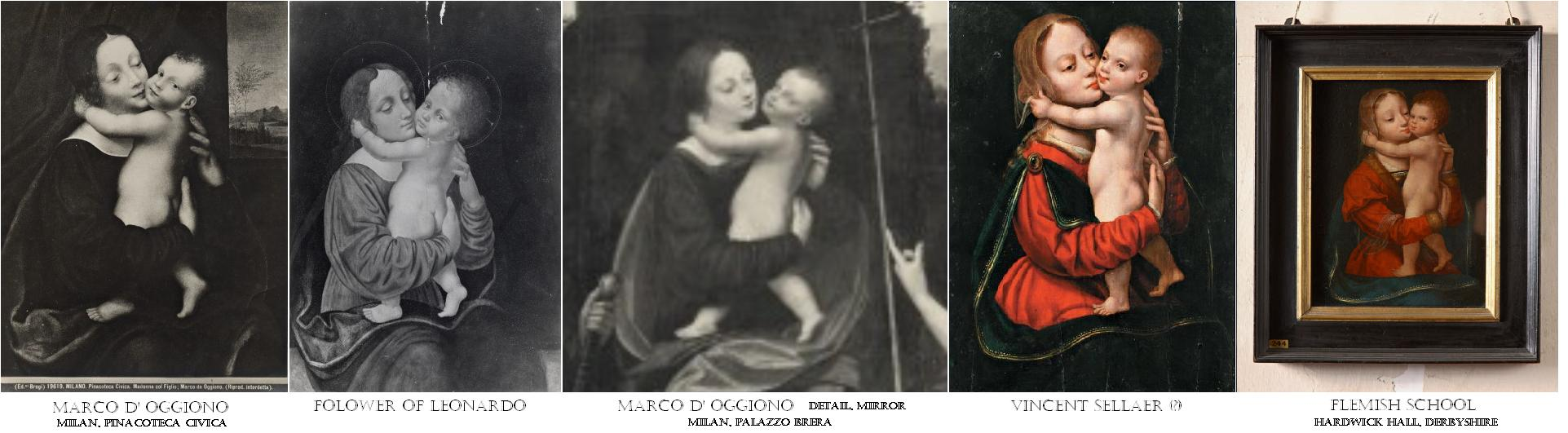
The same composition of Madonna and Child was used by various followers of Leonardo da Vinci, both Milanese and Flemish (Marco d'Oggiono, Anonymous follower of Leonardo da Vinci, Vincent Selaer (?), anonymous Flemish painter)

In 1494–1495 and again in 1505–1507, the German artist Albrecht Dürer traveled to Venice. In Bologna Dürer was taught the principles of linear perspective (possibly by Luca Pacioli or Donato Bramante), and evidently he became familiar with Leonardo's geometrical construction of shadows technique. Several Dürer engravings show a clear interest in the works of Leonardo; for example The Small Horse is based upon the Sforza Horse by Leonardo.

During his second stay in Venice Dürer was influenced by Leonardo's cartoon of Christ among the Doctors, which was commissioned by Isabella d'Este. Dürer produced a painted version of the subject, now in the Museo Thyssen-Bornemisza, Madrid. This is the only painting of Dürer's that was directly influenced by Leonardo, however, Dürer introduced new subjects developed by Leonardo in his art (e.g. the figure of the young Saint John the Baptist in his composition of Madonna with the Siskin in 1506, which was not familiar to Venetian art at the time). Despite the regard in which he was held by the Venetians, Dürer returned to Nuremberg by mid-1507, remaining in Germany until 1520. His reputation had spread throughout Europe and he was on friendly terms and in communication with most of the major artists including Raphael, Giovanni Bellini, and—mainly through Lorenzo di Credi—Leonardo da Vinci.

It is believed that Quentin Matsys had known the work of Leonardo da Vinci in the form of prints made and circulated among northern artists. His Madonna and Child with the Lamb, inspired by Leonardo's The Virgin and Child with Saint Anne, and A Grotesque Old Woman (or The Ugly Duchess), show the influence of Leonardo. This is regarded as evidence that Matsys was greatly influenced by Italian Renaissance artists and that he most likely travelled to Italy, at least for a brief period.

In 1516 or 1517, Leonardo joined the court of Francis I of France. Coincidentally, a Flemish portrait painter, Joos van Cleve, also was summoned to the French court, where he painted the king, queen, and other courtiers. It is thought that Joos van Cleve had spent some time in Italy as well as France on this trip. Like Quentin Massys, a fellow artist of Antwerp, Joos van Cleve appropriated some themes and techniques of Leonardo da Vinci. Often, Joos van Cleve is called the Leonardo of the North. Paintings by the Italian Renaissance artists Giampietrino (Madonna of the Cherries) and Marco d'Oggiono (The Holy Infants Embracing), both assistants in the workshop of Leonardo da Vinci, were a major influence on the Antwerp master. Joos van Cleve produced numerous versions of his own paintings after these models, adapting them to his own style and so creating some of the most successful compositions of the time in northern Europe. His son, Cornelis van Cleve, continued an artistic interest in Leonardo, producing several copies of his father's work and the Madonna of the Yarnwinder.

== Gallery ==
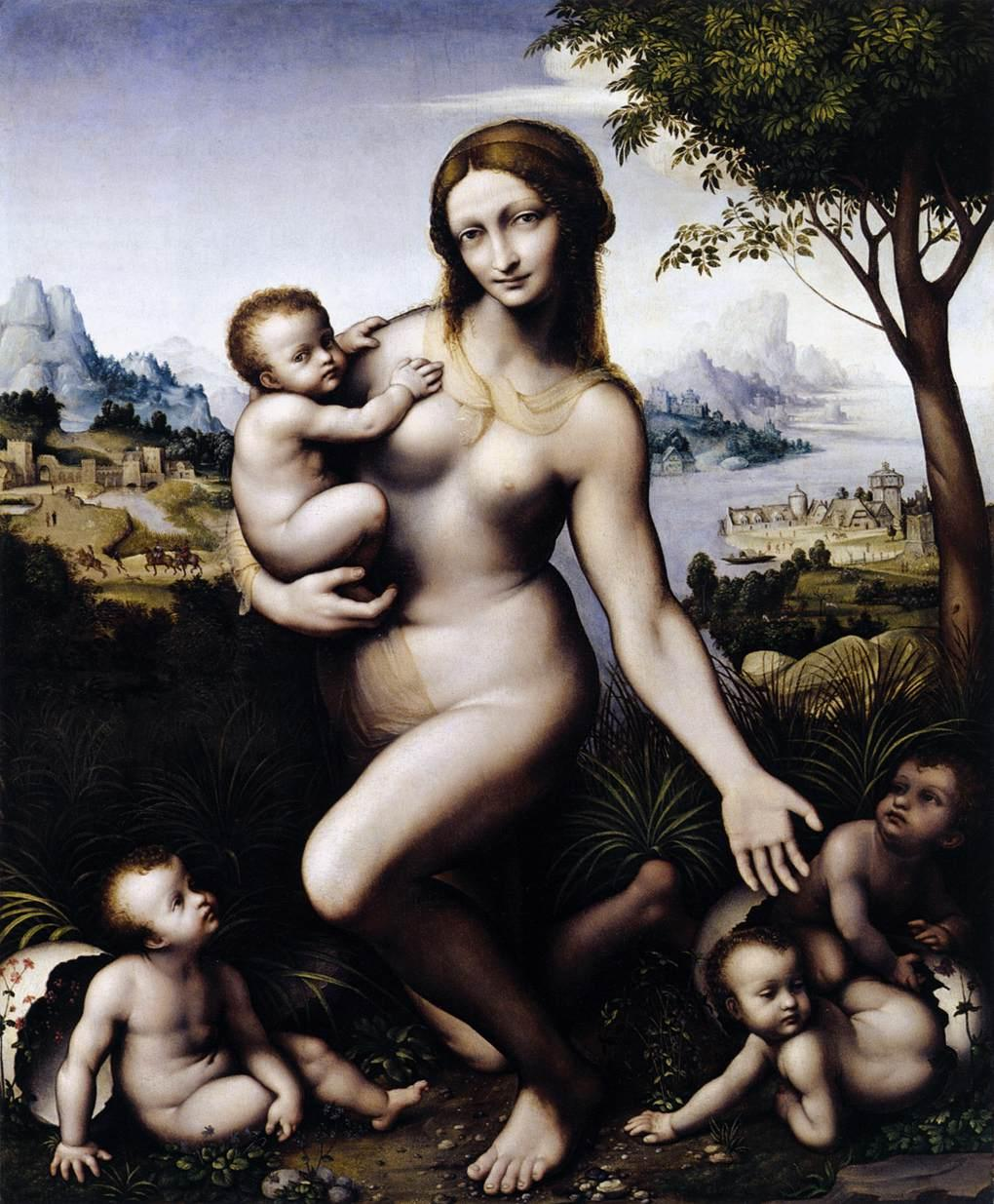
Giampietrino and Bernardino Marchiselli (landscape), Leda and her Children (between 1520s and late 1530s), Museumslandschaft Hessen Kassel

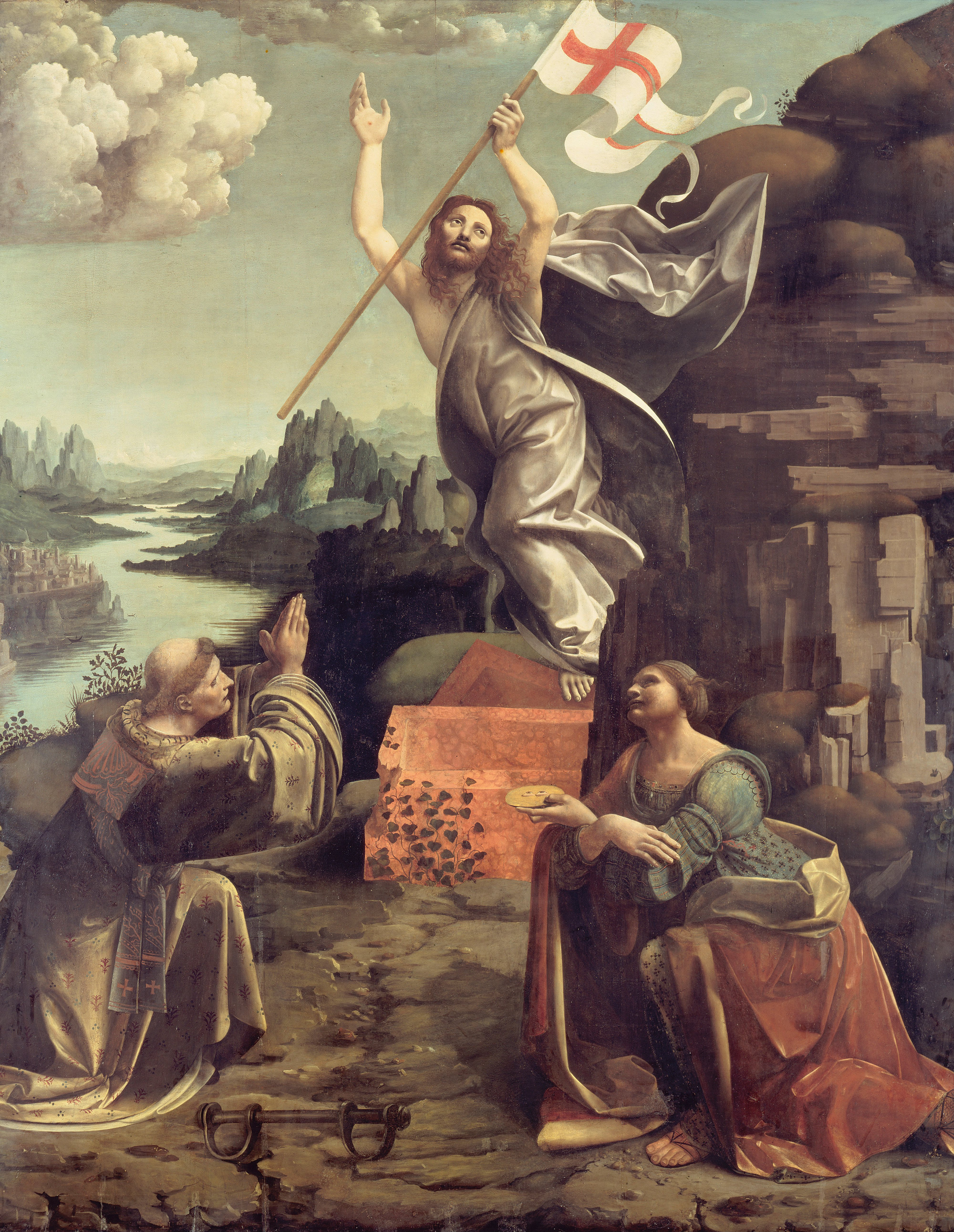
Marco d'Oggiono, Resurrection of Christ with Sts Leonardo and Lucy (between 1491 and 1494), Gemäldegalerie, Berlin

Bernardino Luini, Lady with a Flea Fur (1515), National Gallery of Art, Washington, D.C.

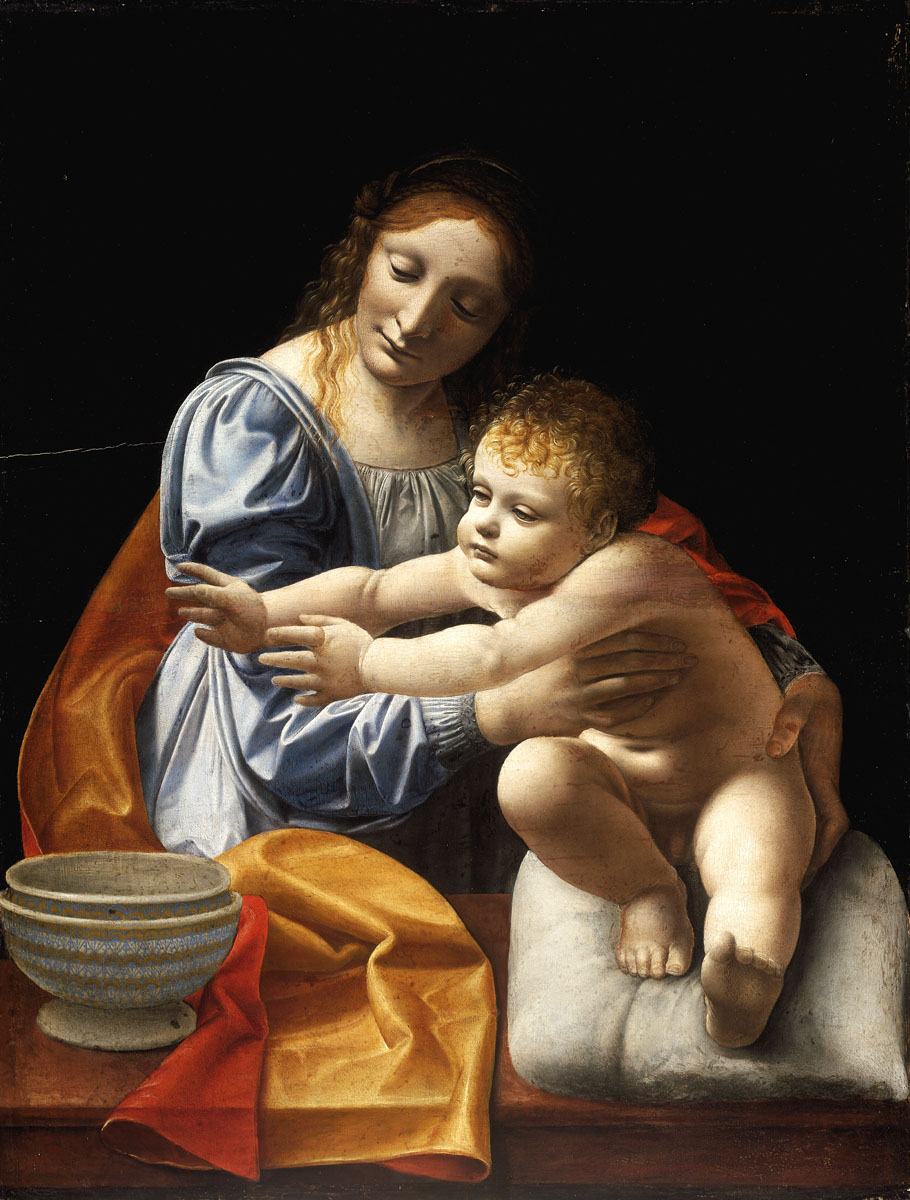
Boltraffio, Madonna and Child (Museum of Fine Arts, Budapest)

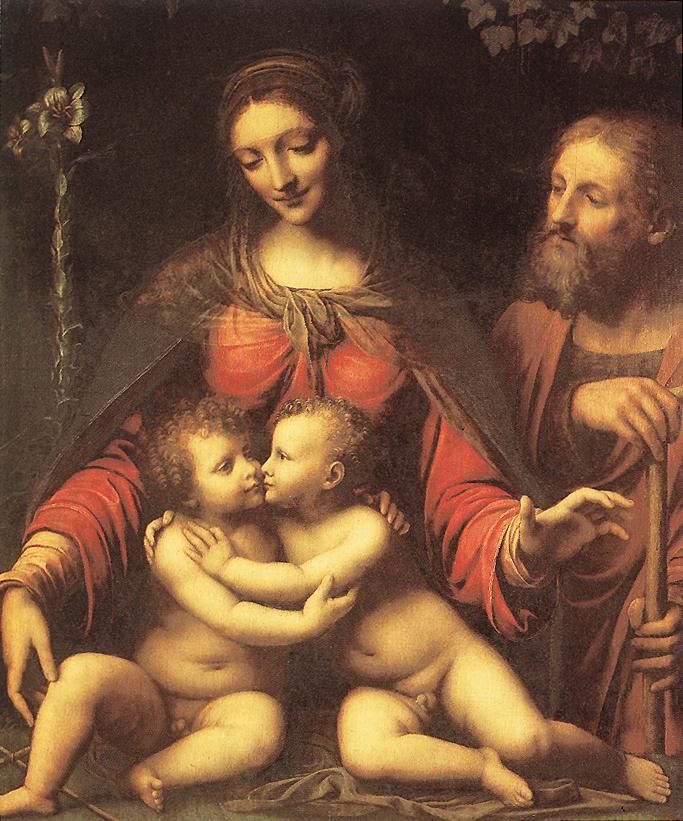
Bernardino Luini, Holy Family with the Infant St John (first half of 16th century), Museo del Prado

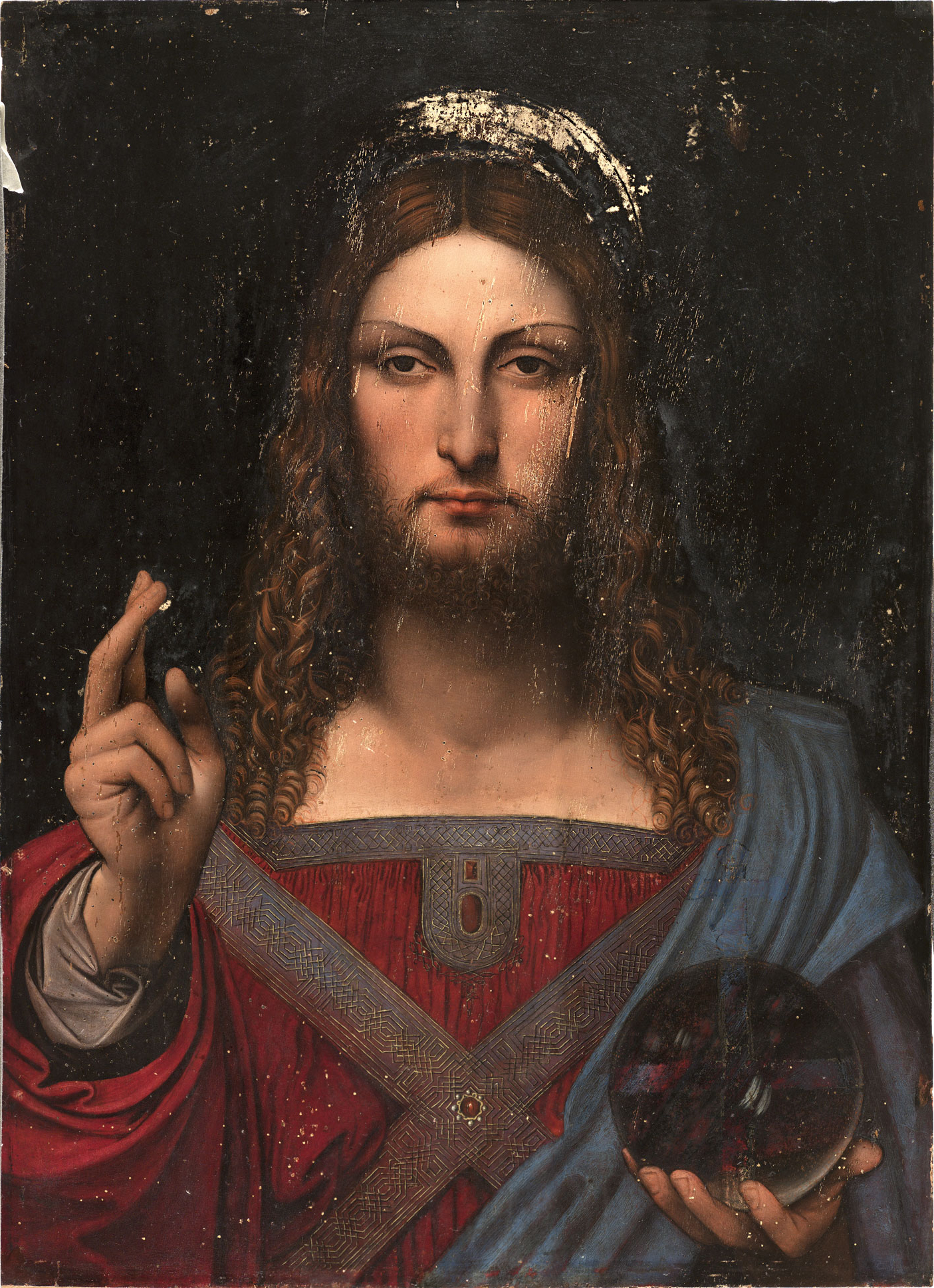
School of Leonardo da Vinci, Salvator Mundi (c. 1503), Diocesan Museum, Naples

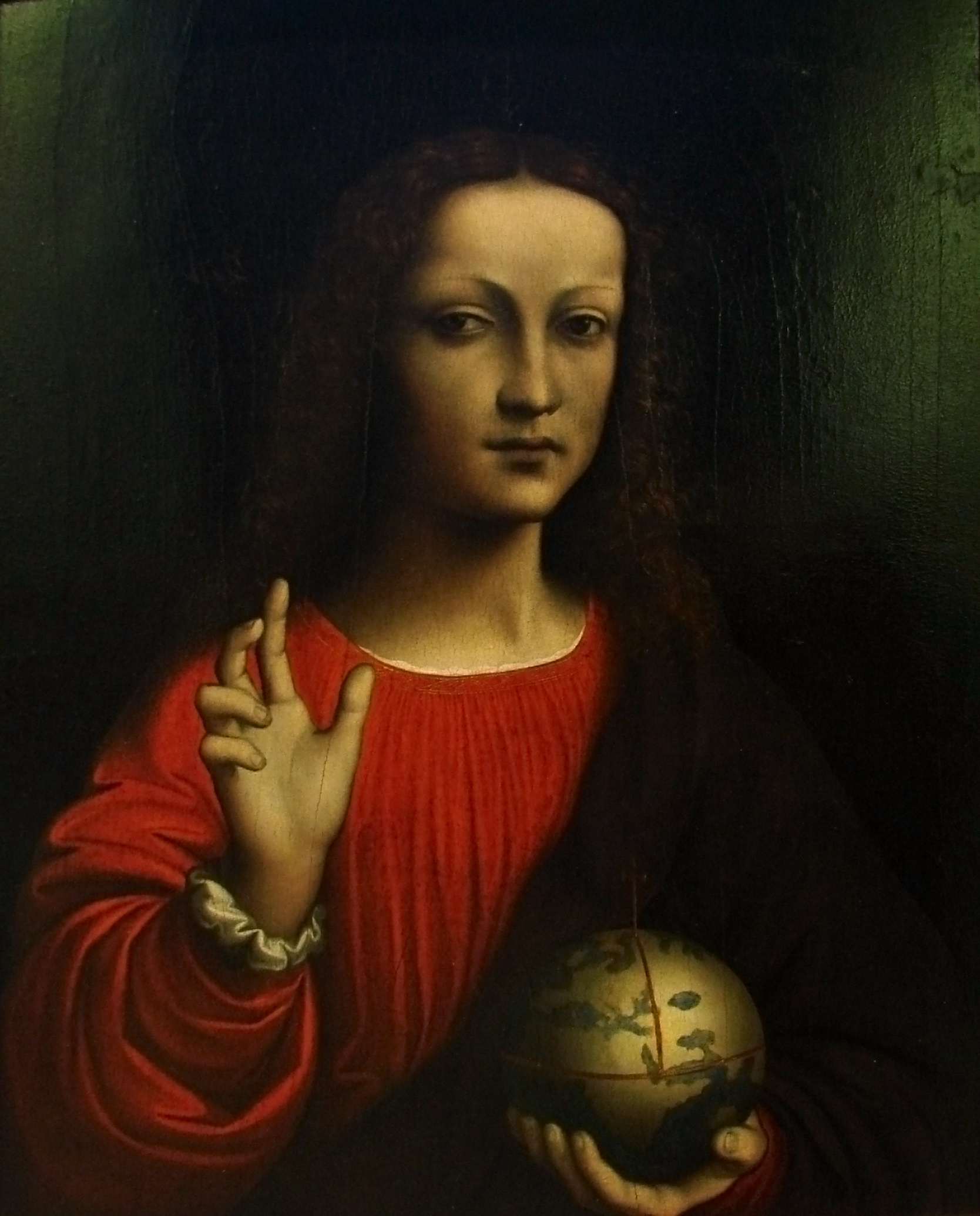
School of Leonardo da Vinci, Le Sauveur du monde (c. 1505), Museum of Fine Arts of Nancy

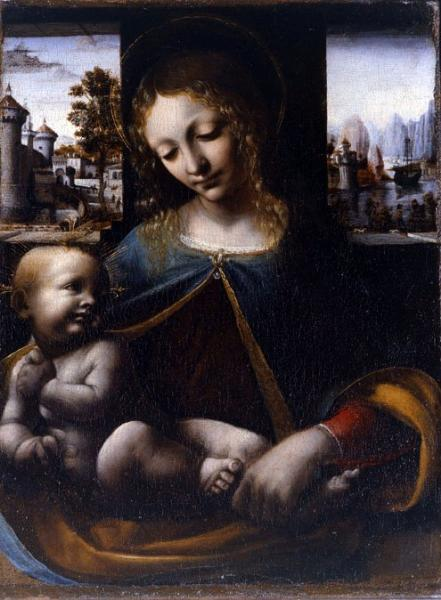
Francesco Napoletano, Madonna and Child (Madonna Lia) (c. 1495), Pinacoteca del Castello Sforzesco

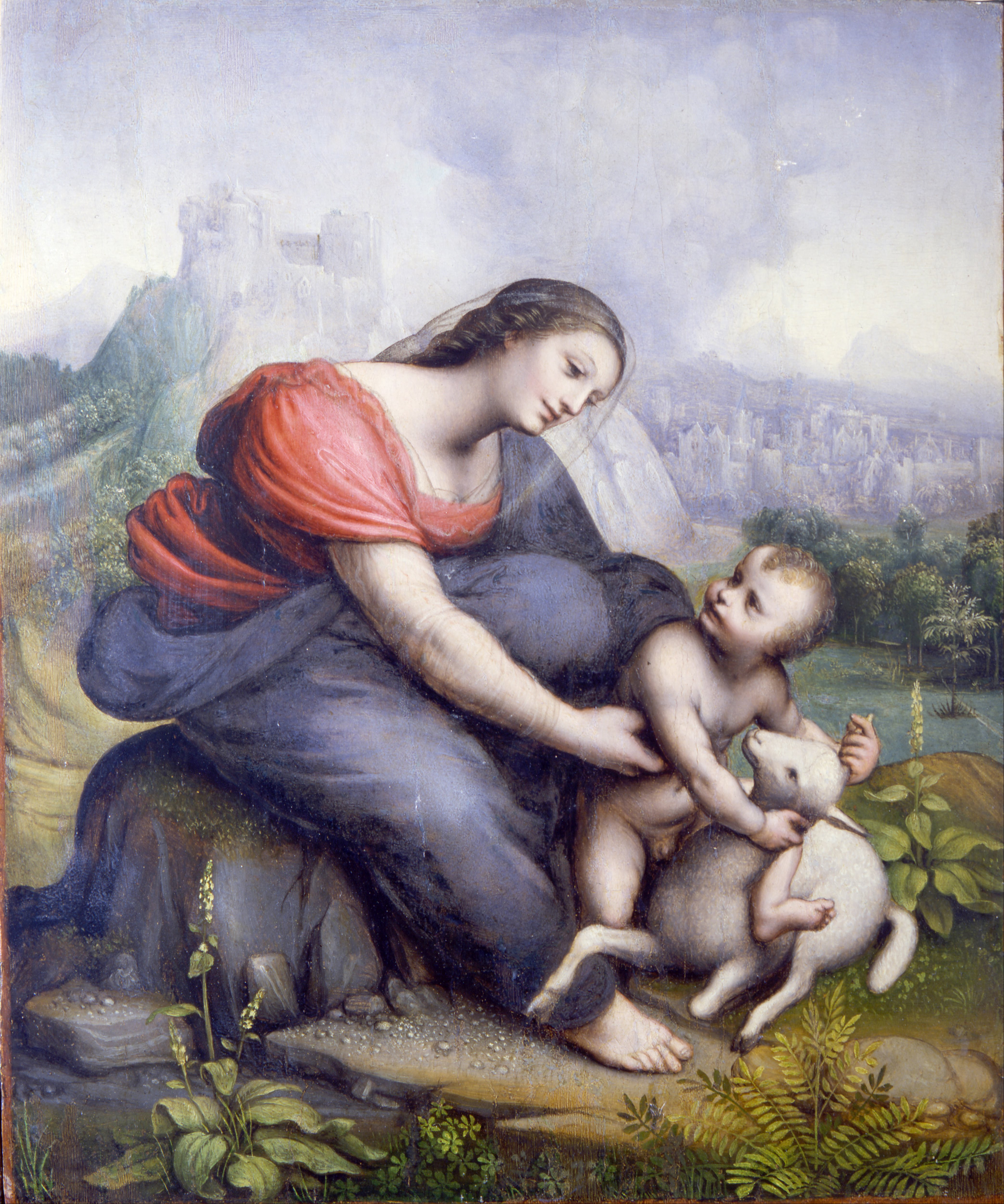
Cesare da Sesto, The Virgin and Child with a Lamb (c. 1520), Museo Poldi Pezzoli

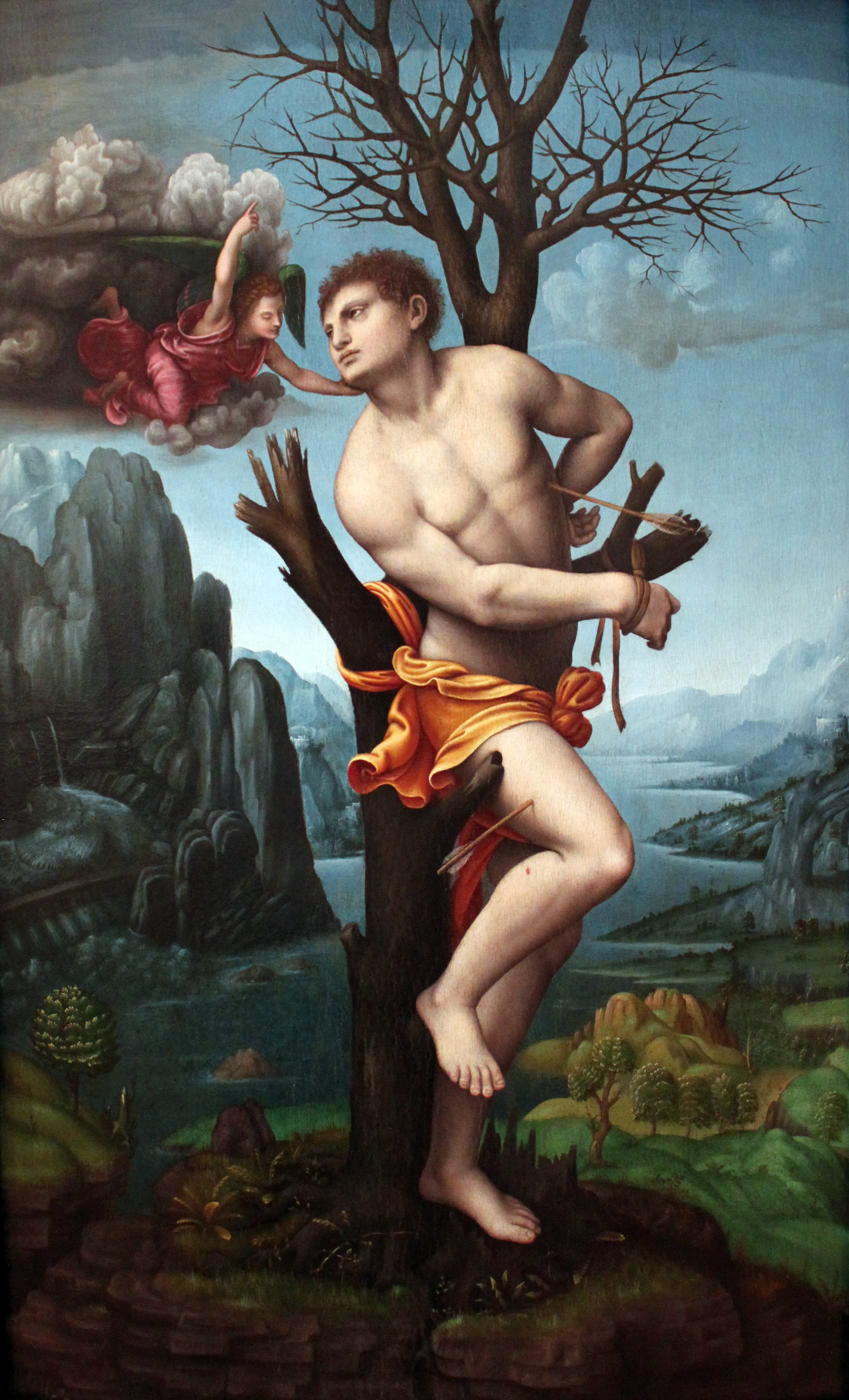
Marco d'Oggiono, Saint Sebastian (1520), Gemäldegalerie, Berlin

== Sources ==
- White Michael. Leonardo da Vinci. The First Scientist. St. Martin's Press, 2000
- Murray Peter, Murray Linda. The Art of the Renaissance. Thames and Hudson Ltd, London, 1997.
- Leonardo da Vinci – 1452–1519
- Leonardo of the north: Joos van Cleve
