= Hernando de los Llanos =

Spanish painter

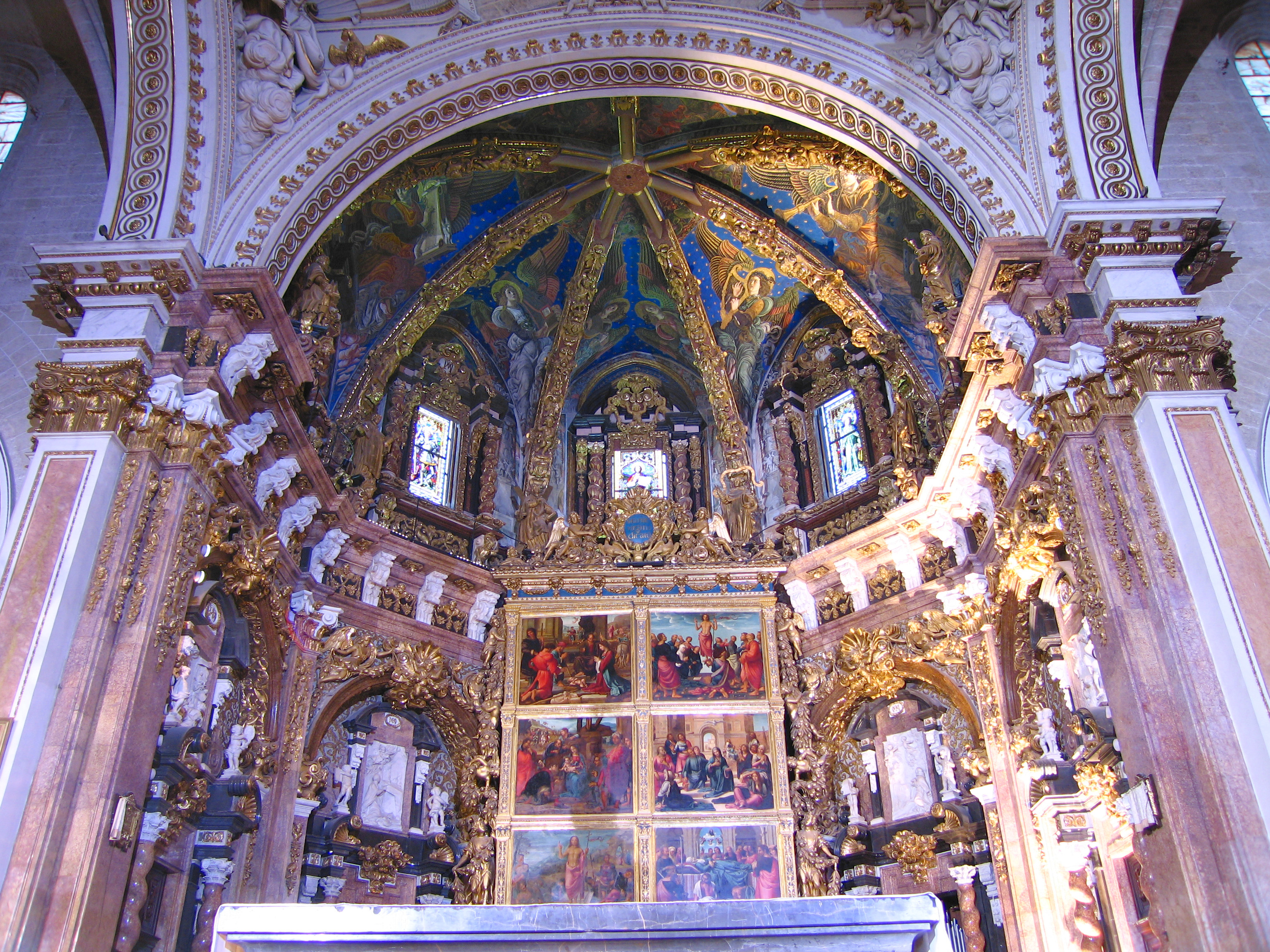
Altarpiece in Valencia, a collaboration between Hernando and Yáñez

Fernando Llanos, also known as Hernando de los Llanos (1470–1525) was a Spanish Renaissance painter active in the early 16th century. A disciple of Leonardo da Vinci, he brought influences of Italian Renaissance painting to Valencia with Fernando Yáñez de la Almedina. Known together as "Los Hernandos", their notable collaborative works include an altarpieces for the Valencia Cathedral and a chapel in Xàtiva. For Murcia Cathedral, Llanos painted a panel of Betrothal of the Virgin.

== Career ==
Little is known about his life or training, though he appears to have been familiar with the models of Leonardo da Vinci and Domenico Ghirlandaio. He worked for a time in Valencia in collaboration with Fernando Yáñez de la Almedina. Hernando los Llanos can be considered to be one of Leonardeschi, at the beginning of 16th century he and Yáñez traveled to Florence and collaborated with Leonardo for his The Battle of Anghiari fresco. Collaboration was fruitful enough, while de los Llanos continued his artistic association on returning home to Spain. He and Yáñez produced several copies after works of Leonardo da Vinci, including:

- Adoration of the Magi. Oil on panel, 194 x 227 cm, Cathedral of Valencia.
- Resurrection of Christ (includes elements from the Battle of Anghiari). Oil on panel, 194 x 227 cm, Cathedral of Valencia.
- Christ carrying the Cross (includes elements from the Battle of Anghiari). Colección El Conventet, Barcelona.
- Workshop of Hernando de los Llanos. Christ carrying the Cross (includes elements from the Battle of Anghiari). Private collection.
- Virgin and Child (Madonna with Yarnwinder). Museo de Bellas Artes, Murcia.
