= Francesco Vicentino =

Italian painter

Francesco Vicentino (active 16th century) was an Italian painter of the Renaissance period. He was born in Milan, and became a pupil of Cesare Bernazano. He painted for Santa Maria delle Grazie at Milan, and other churches.
