= Lillian Schwartz =

American artist (1927–2024)

- Schwartz at Bell Labs in the 1970s
- Born: Lillian Feldman; July 13, 1927; Cincinnati, Ohio, U.S.
- Died: October 12, 2024 (aged 97); Manhattan, New York, U.S.
- Known for: Computer-mediated art
- Spouse: James Schwartz (m. 1946)
- Awards: Winsor McCay Award, Emmy Award

Lillian Feldman Schwartz (July 13, 1927 – October 12, 2024) was an American artist considered a pioneer of computer-mediated art and one of the first artists notable for basing almost her entire oeuvre on computational media. Many of her ground-breaking projects were done in the 1960s and 1970s, well before the desktop computer revolution made computer hardware and software widely available to artists.

== Early life and artistic training ==
Schwartz was born in Cincinnati, Ohio, on July 13, 1927 to Jacob and Katie (Green) Feldman. Jacob was a barber born in Russia; Katie had immigrated from Liverpool, England. Both were Jewish emigres. The youngest of her parents' 13 children, she grew up during the Great Depression. As a young girl, she experimented with slate, mud, sticks, and chalk as free materials for making art. She studied to become a nurse at Cincinnati College of Nursing and Health under a World War II education program and later on found her training in anatomy, biology, and the use of plaster valuable in making art. In 1946 she married James Schwartz, an intern at the Cincinnati General Hospital. By 1949, both were stationed in Japan during the postwar occupation in an area between Hiroshima and Nagasaki, and she contracted polio, which paralyzed her for a time. As part of her rehabilitation, she studied calligraphy with the artist Tshiro.

After her return to the United States, she continued to experiment with media, including metal and plastic sculpture. In this period, she had to have surgery for a thyroid tumor, possibly from exposure to plastic solvents.

== Career ==
By 1966, Schwartz had begun working with light boxes and mechanical devices like pumps, and she became a member of the Experiments in Art and Technology (E.A.T.) group that brought together artists and engineers as collaborators.In 1968 her kinetic sculpture Proxima Centauri was included in the important early show of machine art at the Museum of Modern Art in New York City titled The Machine as Seen at the End of the Mechanical Age. This sculpture was later used as a special effect for a Star Trek episode, in which it served as a prison for Spock's Brain.

Schwartz was brought into Bell Labs by Leon Harmon, where she was a "resident visitor" from 1969 to 2002. While there, she worked with engineers John Vollaro and others, including extensive collaboration with Ken Knowlton, a software engineer and computer artist who had also had work in the 1968 Museum of Modern Art show. That collaboration produced a series of computer-animated films, each built from the output of visual generative algorithms written by Knowlton and edited by Schwartz. She took classes in programming at The New School for Social Research around that same time. She began making paintings and films with a combination of hand painting, digital collaging, computer and other image processing, and optical post-processing, initially working with Knowlton's 1963 computer graphics language, BEFLIX, his subsequent graphics language EXPLOR and also SYMBOLICS. By 1975, Schwartz and Knowlton, in collaboration, had made ten of the first digitally created computer-animated films to be exhibited as works of fine art: Pixillation, Olympiad, UFOs, Enigma, Googolplex, Apotheosis, Affinities, Kinesis, Alae, and Metamorphosis.

While those 10 films did not yet involve the digital editing of images or image sequences, Schwartz having edited them as physical film the conventional way, in her work of subsequent periods, Schwartz's creative cobbling together of different, often cutting-edge technologies has been said to prefigure what would later become common practice in such programs as Photoshop and Final Cut Pro.

Schwartz contributed to scientific research on color perception and sound. She had been a consultant at AT&T Bell Laboratories, IBM's Thomas J. Watson Research Laboratory, Exxon Research Center, and Lucent Technologies Bell Labs Innovations.

== Death ==
Schwartz died at her home in Manhattan on October 12, 2024, at the age of 97.

== Notable works ==
Schwartz used the works of Leonardo da Vinci extensively in experiments with computers. One notable work she created is Mona/Leo, for which she compared the image of a Leonardo da Vinci self-portrait with the Mona Lisa, matching the two faces feature by feature to show their underlying structural similarity. Specifically, she replaced the right side of the Mona Lisa with the flipped left side of a red chalk self-portrait of da Vinci. Superimposed lines drawn on the image showing the close alignments of the bottom of the eye, eyebrow, nose and chin prompted her to argue that the Mona Lisa is in part a cryptic self-portrait of the artist, an idea that has been referred to as the "Mona Leo theory".

In further experiments along these lines, she removed the gray tones in Leonardo da Vinci's self-portrait and superimposed the Mona Lisa eye over it. Not everyone is convinced by her argument for the identity of Leonardo da Vinci and the Mona Lisa; one common counter-argument is that the similarities are due to both portraits having been created by the same person and therefore bearing the hallmarks of a characteristic style. Additionally, though the drawing on which Schwartz based the comparison is held to be a self-portrait, there is no firm historical evidence to support this theory.

In a similar experiment, Schwartz used a custom ray-tracing program to investigate the perspective anomalies in the drawing of da Vinci's fresco painting of the Last Supper. Her 3D computer-generated model showed that the perspective lines in the Last Supper do match up with (extend) the architecture of the refectory of Santa Maria delle Grazie in Milan where the fresco is located, but only because of certain changes Leonardo made to standard linear perspective.

Other works also include 1970's Pixillation, her first computer-animated film, and 1971's Olympiad.

== Reception and legacy ==
Schwartz was called a pioneer in "establishing computers as a valid and fruitful artistic medium" by physicist and Nobel laureate Arno Penzias and a trailblazer and virtuoso by the philosopher-artist Timothy Binkley. Her films have been included in the Venice Biennale and the Cannes Film Festival, among many others, and have received numerous awards. In 1984, Schwartz created a computer-generated TV spot that for the newly renovated Museum of Modern Art in New York; the public service announcement won an Emmy Award.

In 2016, Schwartz had a retrospective one-person exhibition at the New York City gallery Magenta Plains. Schwartz's artworks have also been exhibited at the Museum of Modern Art (New York), the Metropolitan Museum of Art, the Whitney Museum of American Art, the Moderna Museet (Stockholm), Centre Pompidou (Paris), Stedelijk Museum of Art (Amsterdam), and the Grand Palais Museum (Paris), and at numerous galleries and festivals worldwide. In 2022, a career-spanning retrospective exhibition was held at The Henry Ford and a satellite version at Art-Windsor Essex. Schwartz was a visiting member of the Computer Science Department at the University of Maryland; an adjunct professor at Kean College, Fine Arts Department; an adjunct professor at the Rutgers University Visual Arts Department; a visiting scholar at New York University, and a Member of the Graduate Faculty of The School of Visual Arts, NYC. She was also an Artist in Residence at Channel 13, WNET, New York. She was a fellow of the World Academy of Science and Art from 1988 on.

In 2021, Schwartz's collection of films, art, and personal papers were donated to The Henry Ford, who now manage artist rights, legacy, licensing and loans of her material.

== List of awards and grants ==
- Winsor McCay Award, 2021
- ACM SIGGRAPH 2015 Distinguished Artist Award for Lifetime Achievement in Digital Art, 2015
- Information Film Producers of America Cindy Award for the Museum of Modern Art public service announcement, 1985
- 27th Annual American Film Festival Award for the Museum of Modern Art public service announcement, 1985
- 28th Annual New York Emmy Awards, Outstanding Public Service Announcement Award for Museum of Modern Art public service announcement, 1984
- National Endowment for the Arts Grant, 1982
- Pablo Neruda Director's & Writer's Award for Poet of His People, 1978
- Director's & Purchase Award, Sinking Creek Film Festival, for L'Oiseau, 1978
- National Academy of Television, Arts, & Sciences, Special Award for Special Effects for Enigma, 1972
- International ICOGRADA Jury Award for U.F.O.'s, 1972
- Award for Excellence at Festival International du Cinema en 16 mm. de Montreal, for Enigma, 1972
- CINE Golden Eagle Award for Pixillation, 1971

== List of publications ==
- "Computer-Aided Illusion: Ambiguity, Perspective and Motion." Visual Computer, June 1998.
- "Computers and Appropriation Art: The Transformation of a Work or Idea For a New Creation." Leonardo, 29:1, 1996.
- "Electronic Restoration: Preserving and Restoring Great Works of Art." SCAN '95 Proceedings, 1995.
- "The Art Historian's Computer." Scientific American, April 1995.
- "The Morphing of Mona." Computers & Graphics Special Issue, ed. C. Machover, Pergamon Press, 1995.
- "Lessons from Leonardo da Vinci: Additions to His Treatise on Computers and Art." World Academy of Art and Science Proceedings, Dec. 1992.
- "Piero della Francesca and the Computer: Analysis, Reconstruction, and Inheritance." Visual Computer, Springer-Verlag, 1993.
- The Computer Artist's Handbook (with Laurens R. Schwartz). Norton, 1992.
- "The Mask of Shakespeare." Pixel - Journal of Scientific Visualization, 3:3, March/April 1992.
- "Computer Artists as Interactive Performers: The First Digital Transmission Via Satellite of a Real-Time Drawing." SCAN: Proceedings of the Eleventh Annual Symposium on Small Computers in the Arts, Nov. 15–17, 1991.
- "Real-Time Art by Computer." Interactive Art and Artificial Reality, ed. Gregory Garvey, ACM Siggraph, Aug. 1990.
- "The Mona Lisa Identification." The Visual Computer, Springer-Verlag, 1988.
- "The Staging of Leonardo's Last Supper." Leonardo (Supplemental Issue), Pergamon Press, 1988.
- "From UFO's to Pablo Neruda." Scientific American/International Proceedings Art Expo - Hanover, 1988.
- "Leonardo's Mona Lisa." Art & Antiques, Jan. 1987.
- "The Computer and Creativity." Transactions of the American Philosophical Society, vol. 75, part 6, 1985.
- "Experimenting with Computer Animation." Siggraph '84: Interdisciplinary Issues in Computer Art and Design, 1984.
- "Filmmaking with Computer" (with C.B. Rubinstein). Interdisciplinary Science Reviews, 4:4, 1979.
- "Art-Film-Computer." Artist and the Computer, ed. Ruth Leavitt, Harmony Books, 1976.
- "The Artist and Computer Animation." Computer Animation, ed. John Halas, Hastings House, 1974.

== See also ==
- Independent animation
