= Leda with Her Children =

1515–1520 painting by Giampietrino

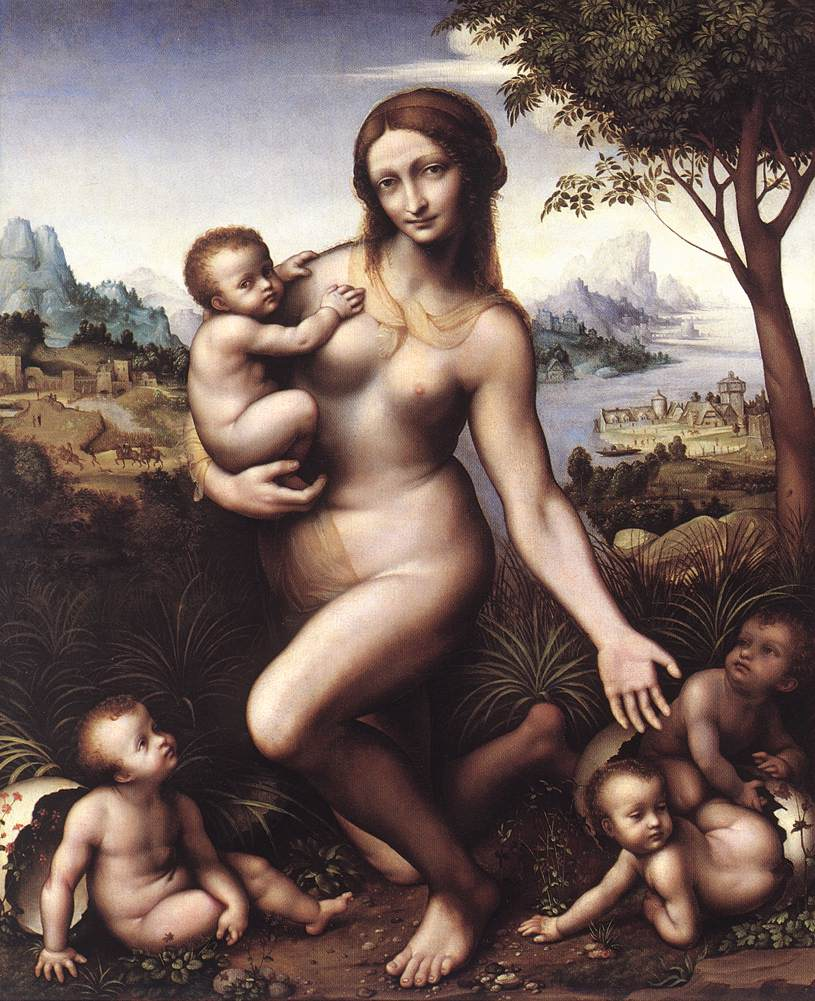
Giampietrino, Kneeling Leda with Her Children, 1515/1520, oil on alder wood, 128 x 105,5 cm, Gemäldegalerie Alte Meister, Kassel, inv. GK 966

Kneeling Leda with Her Children is a 16th-century painting by Leonardo da Vinci's pupil Giampietrino. It is now in the Gemäldegalerie Alte Meister (Kassel).

== Description ==
It is based on sketches for Leonardo's own Leda and the Swan, now in the collections of Windsor Castle, the Museum Boijmans Van Beuningen, in Rotterdam, and Chatsworth House.

The beautiful princess Leda is seduced by Zeus who transformed himself to a magnificent swan. On the same night, Leda would also sleep with her husband, King Tyndareus of Sparta. The result is a pair of twins, the beautiful Helen and the immortal Pollux as children of Zeus, Clytemnestra and the mortal Castor as offspring of Tyndareus. While Giampietrino omitted the swan in the Kassel painting, the eggshells betray the divine liaison.

Infrared spectroscopy has revealed two different underdrawings: one underdrawing corresponding with the figure of Leda and her children, and a second one, using the spolvero technique, exactly repeating The Virgin and Child with Saint Anne of the Louvre. This states the existence of an original cartoon by Leonardo accessible to his pupil Giampietrino. If Giampietrino also used a cartoon of the Leda by his master is still unknown. A probable model could have been the antique statue of the Crouching Venus. The figurative parts with their monumental and dominant appearance are painted in 1512/1520 by Giampietrino. The Nordic landscape with its rich details is attributed to the landscape painter Cesare Bernazzano, who also collaborated with other pupils of Leonardo.

Johann Wolfgang von Goethe admired the painting in Kassel in 1779, 1783, 1792 and 1801 considering it an original Leonardo painting.

== Provenance ==
William VIII, landgrave of Hesse-Kassel acquired the painting in 1756 at a Paris auction as a depiction of Caritas by Leonardo da Vinci, because one of the children and the eggshells were overpainted. In 1806, in the Coalition Wars it was stored by William I in the Sababurg to hide it from the advancing Grande Armée. Yet the hideout was revealed and general Joseph Lagrange seized it as loot. The painting would never reach its final destination, Château de Malmaison, home of the Empress Joséphine. It was lost in the chaos of war and came instead on the French art market. It subsequently came to light in a Parisian private collection in 1821. The Mannheim art dealer Artaria offered it to William I who strictly refused to rebuy stolen works of his art collection.

Through mediation of the Belgian painter and art dealer Pierre Joseph Lafontaine it joined the art collection of King William II in The Hague. After his death the painting came in the possession of his brother Prince Frederick of Orange-Nassau and thereupon to the house of Nassau-Weilburg in Neuwied. In 1940 it was acquired for 150.000 Reichsmark by Gauleiter Erich Koch as a gift to Hermann Göring who already possessed a large art collection of nudes of the Gothic and Renaissance period in Carinhall. In 1943 he organised its storage in the Salzbergwerk Altaussee in Styria.

After the end of the Second World War the Leda was brought to the Central Collecting Point in Munich and in 1962 reacquired by the Land Hesse.

== Sources ==
- Jürgen M. Lehmann: Staatliche Kunstsammlungen Kassel. Katalog 1. Italienische, französische und spanische Gemälde des 16.-18. Jahrhunderts. Fridingen 1980, p. 130–133.
- Giulio Bora et al.: The Legacy of Leonardo. Painters in Lombardy 1490–1530, Milano 1998, p. 279.
- Jürgen M. Lehmann: Zur Knienden Leda mit ihren Kindern von Giampietrino in der Kasseler Gemäldegalerie. In: D. Dombrowski, K. Heusing, A. Dern (Hrsg.): Zwischen den Welten. Beiträge zur Kunstgeschichte für Jürg Meyer zur Capellen. Festschrift zum 60. Geburtstag. Weimar 2001, p. 92–105.
