= Giampietrino =

16th-century Italian painter

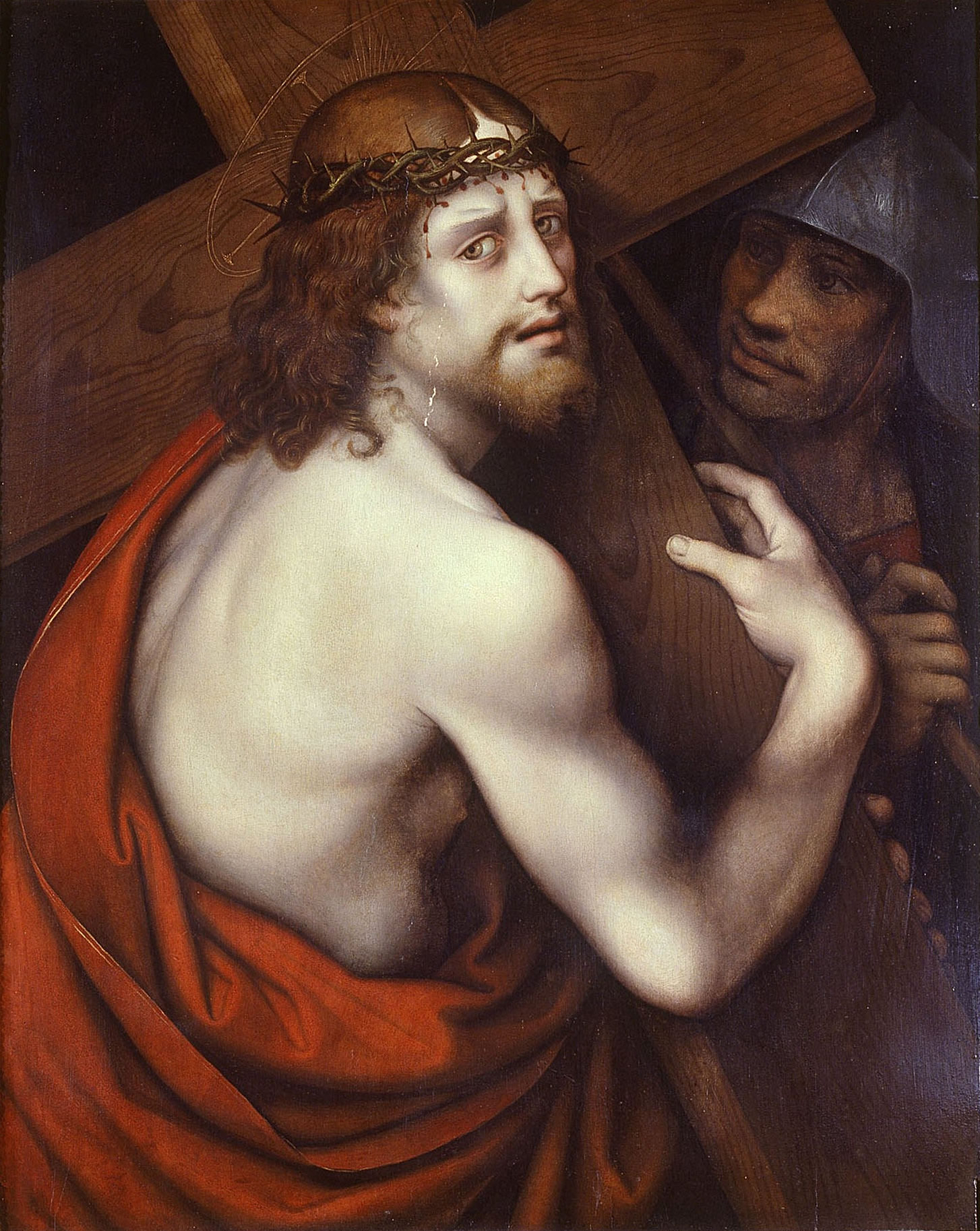
Christ Carrying the Cross by Giovan Pietro Rizzoli known as Giampietrino, early 1530s

Giampietrino, probably Giovanni Pietro Rizzoli (active 1495–1549), was a north Italian painter of the Lombard school and Leonardo's circle, succinctly characterized by S. J. Freedberg as an "exploiter of Leonardo's repertory."

== Biography ==
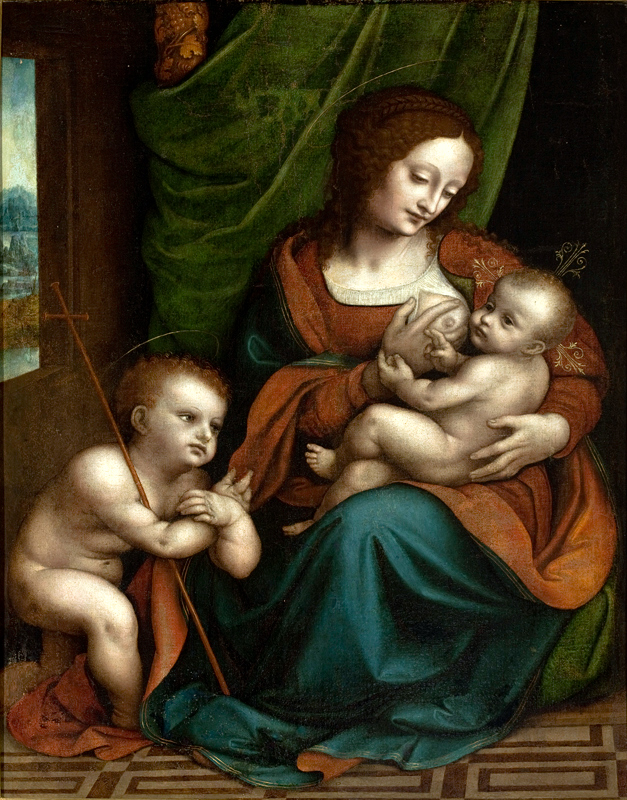
The Virgin Nursing the Child with St. John the Baptist in Adoration (ca. 1500–20), Giampietrino, Museu de Arte de São Paulo

Giampietrino was a productive painter of large altarpieces, Madonnas, holy women in half figure, and mythological women. For a long time, the true identity of the artist was unknown; he was only known as a so-called "Giampietrino" whose name appeared in lists of the members of Leonardo's studio. In 1929, Wilhelm Suida suggested that he could perhaps be Giovanni Battista Belmonte, since a Madonna signed with this name and dated 1509 had been associated stylistically with Giampietrino. Since then, this assumption is considered outdated, and Giampietrino is identified predominantly with Giovanni Pietro Rizzoli, who is known through documents.

Giampietrino has been regarded as a talented painter who contributed substantially to the distribution of the late style of Leonardo da Vinci. He copied many works by Leonardo, as well as leaving behind numerous capable original compositions of his own. Many of his works are preserved in multiple versions of the same subject.

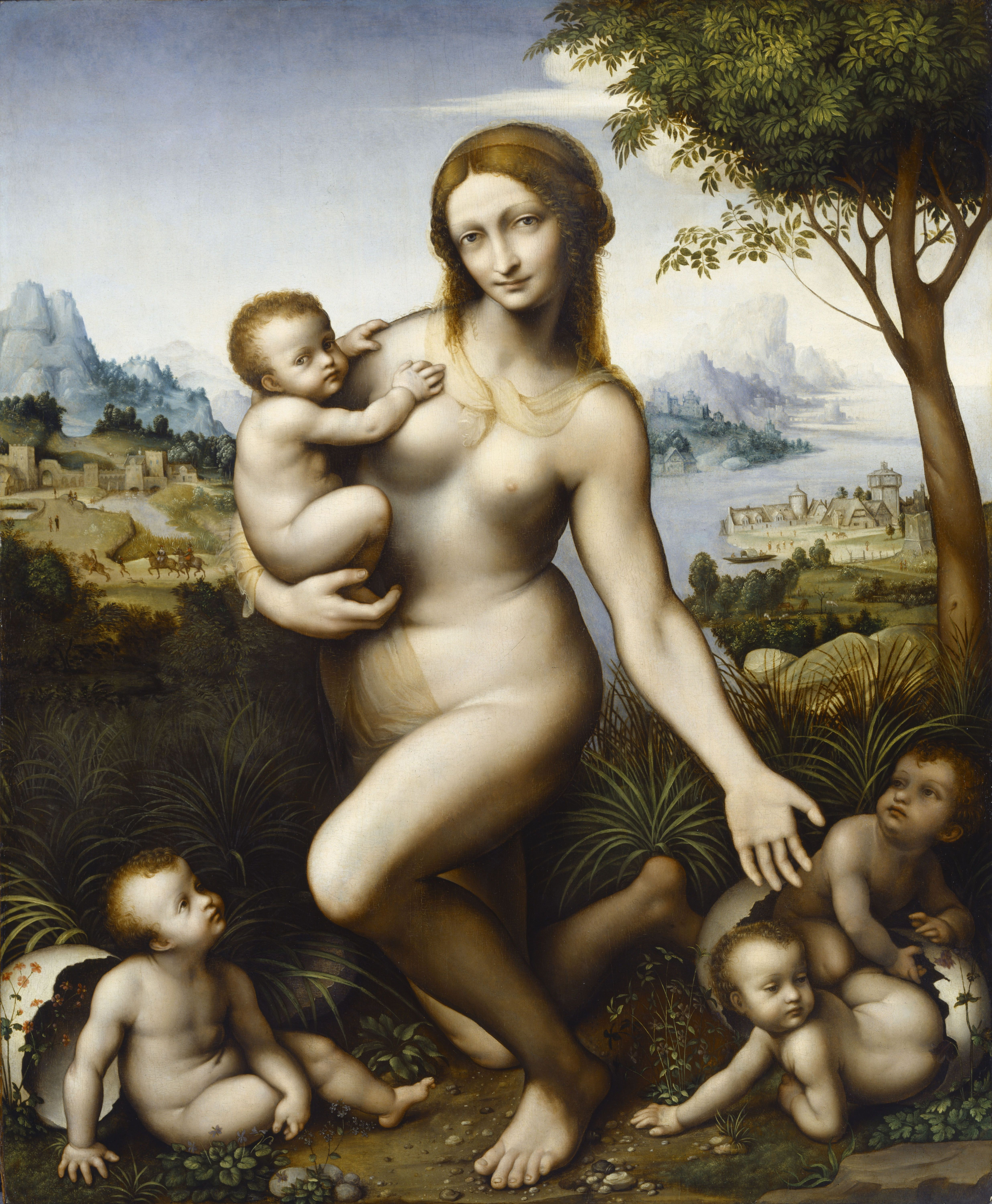
Leda con i loro figli

== Selected works ==
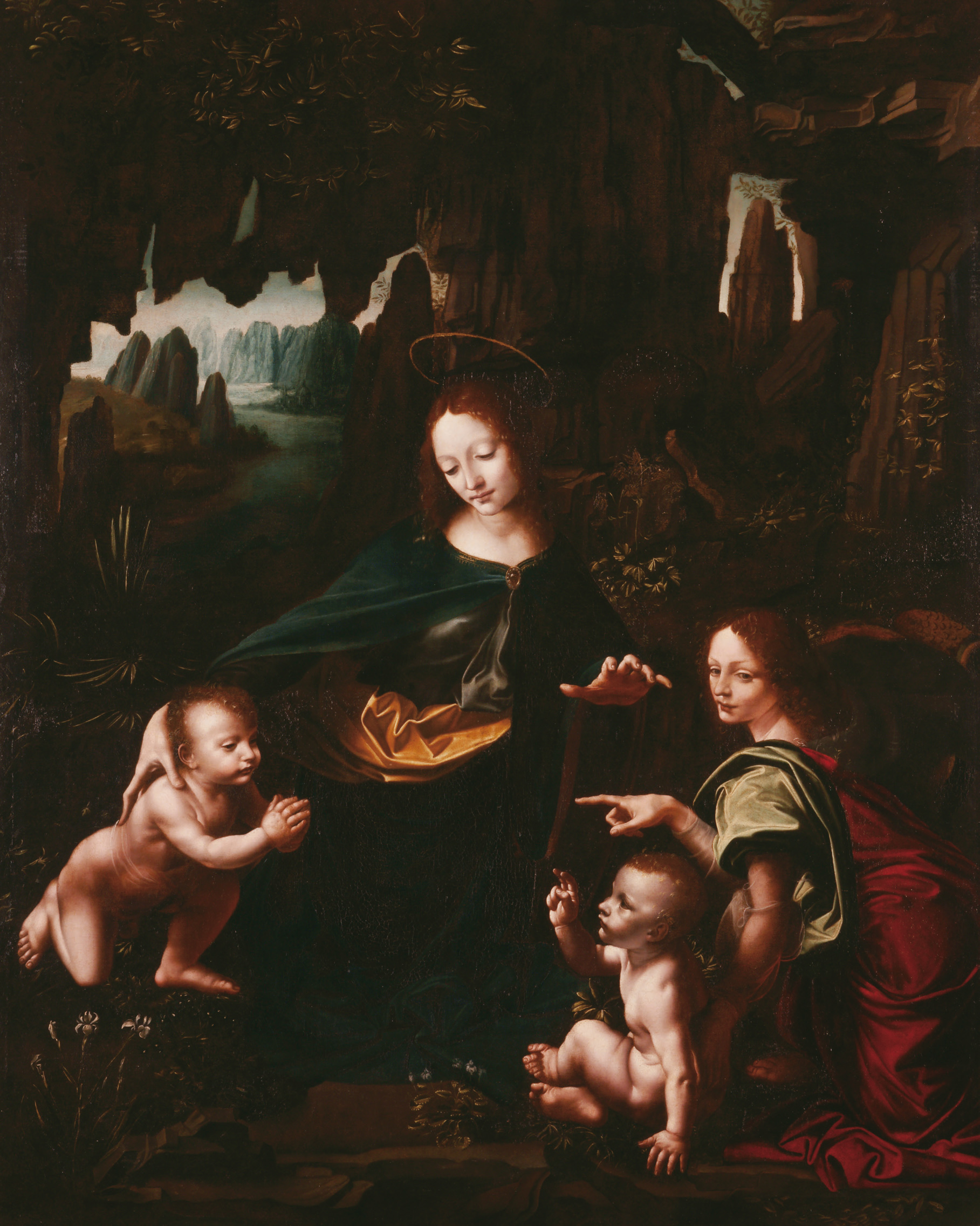
Vergine delle Rocce or Virgin of the Rocks Cheramy, a meticulous copy of Virgin of the Rocks in the Louvre painted by Leonardo da Vinci. Recently the subject of a new book (2017) and attributed to Leonardo and workshop by Professor Carlo Pedretti. Previously incorrectly attributed only to Giampetrino. Mentioned by Jean-Auguste-Dominique Ingres in 1845 and by Pierre Puvis de Chavannes, who were both convinced that it was a Leonardo original. According to the world's top Leonardo expert Professor Carlo Pedretti, this painting "is wholly similar to the one in the Louvre" (see http://www.italymagazine.com/italy/marche/virgin-rocks-smash-hit, Italy Magazine, "Virgin of the rocks a smash hit," 9 November 2005). Pedretti says the work - only recently recovered from another private collection - shows "clear signs" of the master's hand. Following detailed restoration of the work, Pedretti is convinced that it is an original Leonardo (Leonardo da Vinci : the "Virgin of the rocks" in the Cheramy version : its history & critical fortune, by Carlo Pedretti and Sara Taglialagamba, 2017).

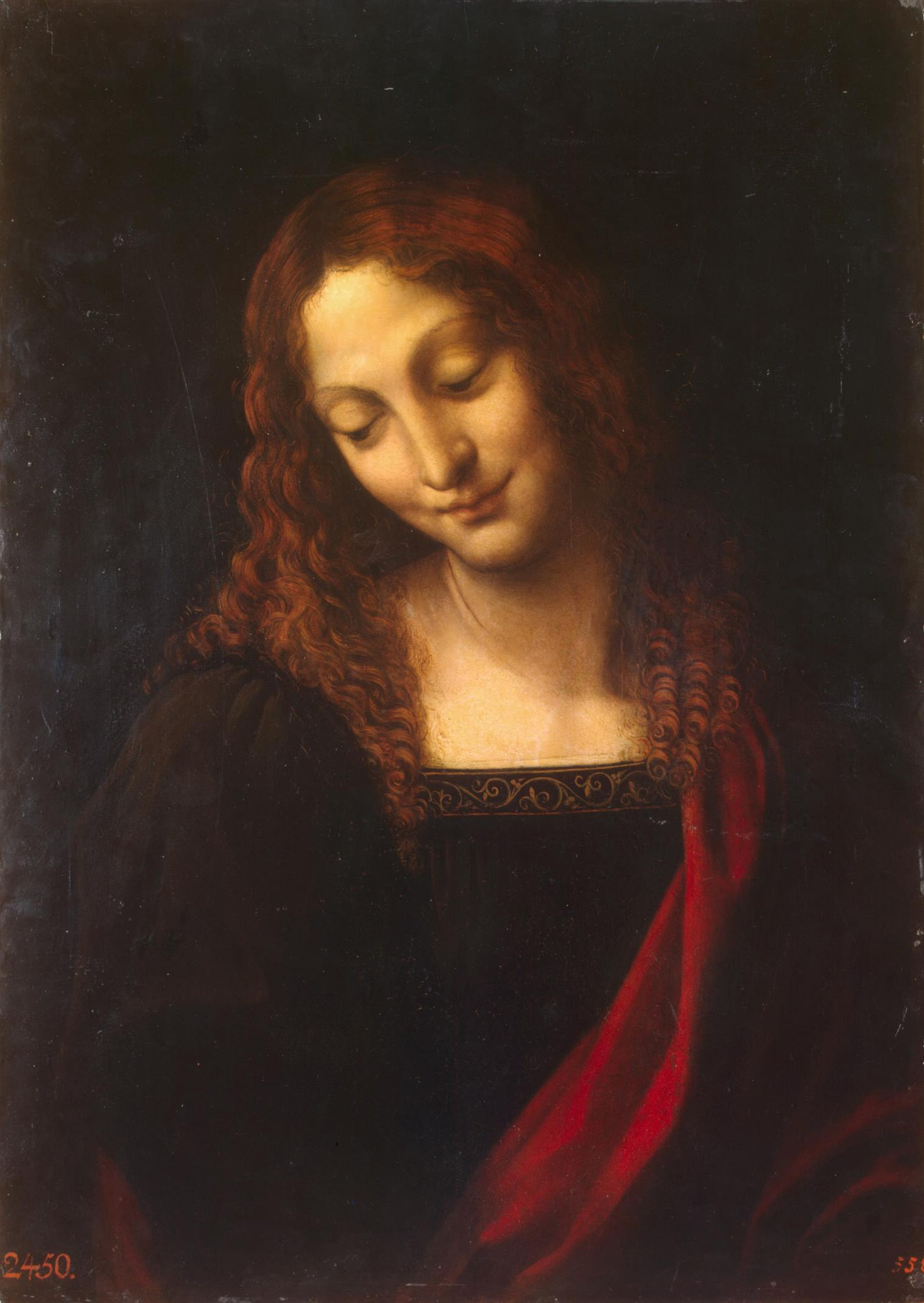
St. John in Hermitage

Christ with the Symbol of the Trinity

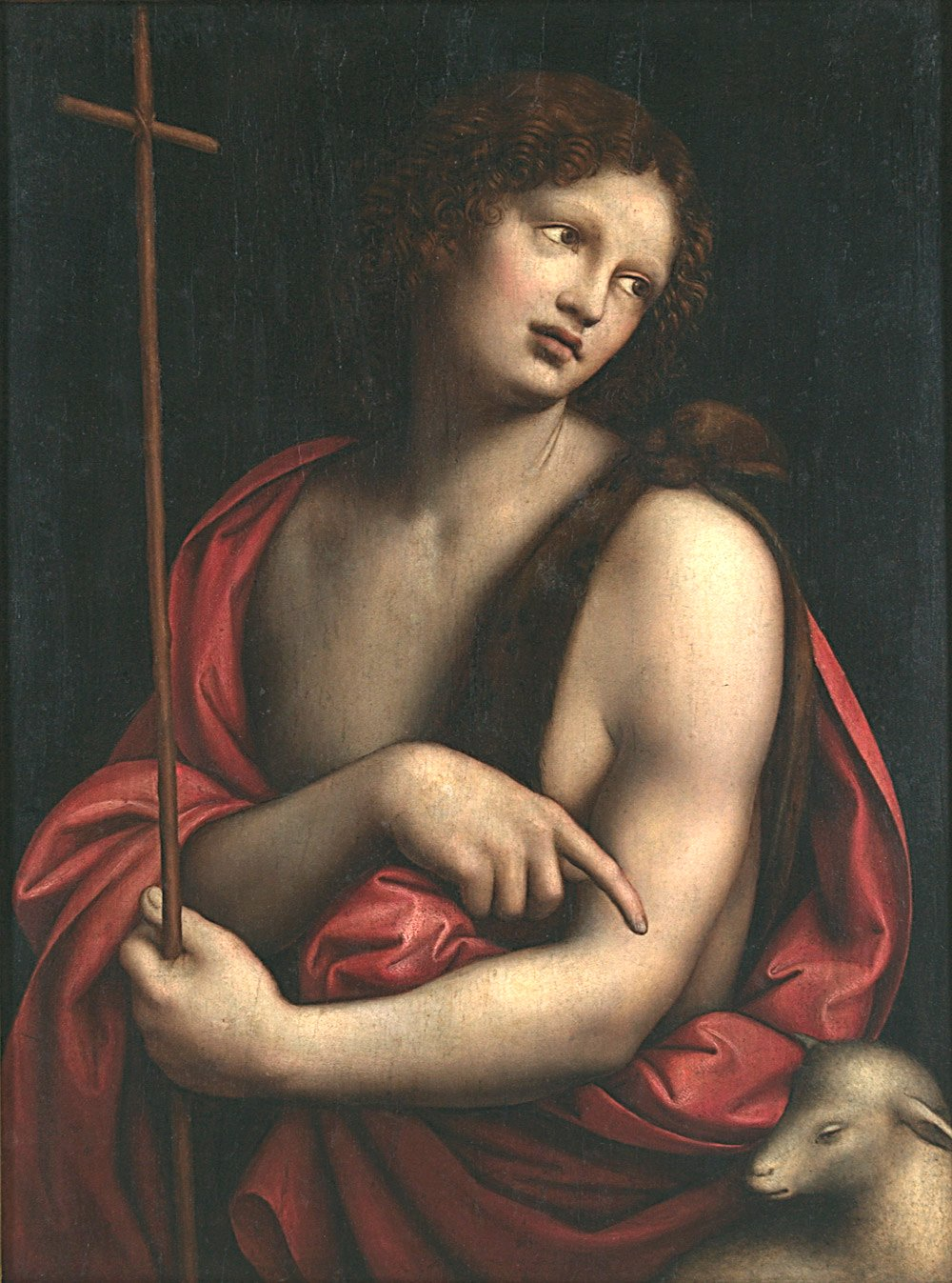
St. John the Baptist

Salome

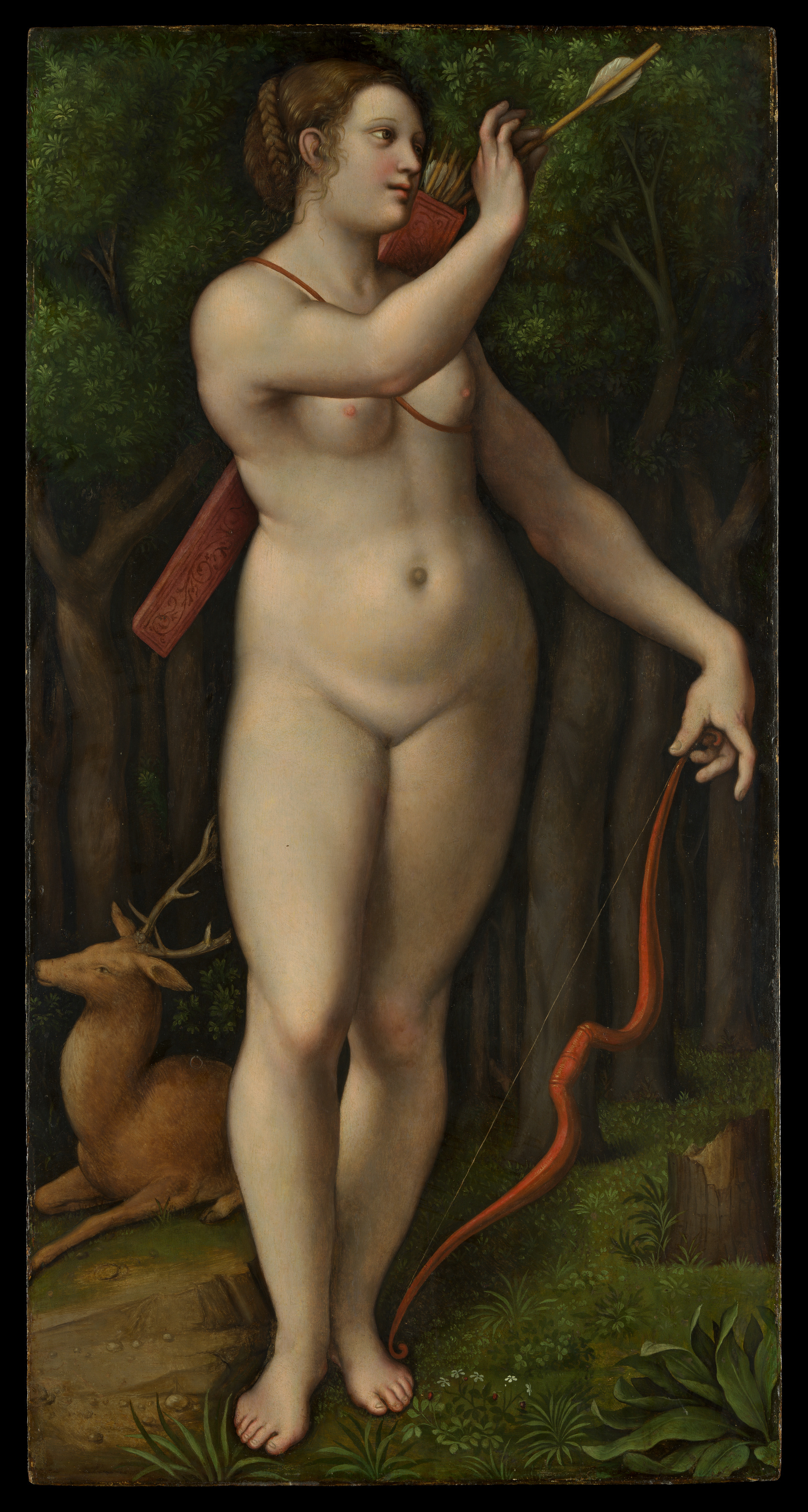
Diana the Huntress

- Amsterdam, Rijksmuseum
  - Mary with the Child. (attributed)
- Berlin, Gemäldegalerie
  - St. Mary Magdalene in the prayer.
  - St. Catharine of Alexandria
  - Weeping Christ with a founder.
  - The Birth Christ. (attributed)
- Budapest, Hungary Museum of Fine Arts
  - Madonna and Child with Saints Jerome and Michael (1535)
- Burgos, Cathedral
  - Mary Magdalene.
- Cambridge (Massachusetts), Fogg Art Museum, Harvard University Art Museum
  - The Holy Family.
- Chantilly, Musée Condé
  - Head of a Woman. (Fragment)
- Detroit, Detroit Institute of Arts
  - Salvator Mundi
- Gazzada Schianno, Museo Cagnola
  - The Holy Family.
- Florence, Uffizi Gallery
  - Saint Catherine of Alexandria.
- Gloucester, Highnam Court
  - Mary with the Child (Madonna with the Lily). (attributed)
- Isola Bella, Collezione Borromeo
  - Dido.
  - Sophronia.
- Kassel, Old Master Picture Gallery
  - Leda and her Children.
- Lewisburg, Bucknell University Art Gallery
  - Cleopatra. around 1525
- London, Courtauld institutes Galleries
  - Mary with the Child and the St. Jerome. (attributed)
  - Mary with the Child (Madonna with the Lily). (attributed)
- London, National Gallery
  - Christ, Carrying the Cross. around 1510 - 1530
  - Salome. around 1510 - 1530
- London, Private Collections
  - Salome.
  - Ecce Homo.
- London, Royal Academy
  - The Holy Communion.
  - The Last Supper, after Leonardo da Vinci
- Madison (Wisconsin), Chazen Museum of Art, University of Wisconsin–Madison
  - Lucrezia Romana. around 1525
- Milan, Collezione Brivio Sforza
  - The Nymph Hegeria.
- Milan, Collezione Nembrini
  - Venus and Cupid.
- Milan, Private collection
  - Christ with the Crown of Thorns.
- Milan, Collezione Rob Smeets
  - Mary with the Child (Madonna with the Cherries).
- Milan, Museo Bagatti Valsecchi
  - Polyptych: Madonna Enthroned with Saints, Christ the Redeemer, and Christ as Salvator Mundi.
- Milan, Pinacoteca Ambrosiana
  - Mary with the Child.
  - The Holy Family with St. Roch
  - St. John the Evangelist.
  - Ecce homo.
- Milan, Pinacoteca del Castello Sforzesco
  - St. Mary Magdalene
- Milan, Pinacoteca di Brera
  - St. Mary Magdalene Reading.
  - Paying for Mary Magdalene.
  - Mary with the Child and the Lamb. (unfinished)
  - Mary with the Child.
- Milan, Sant' Alessandro
  - Christ at the Scourge Column.
- Morimondo, Abbazia di Santa Maria di Morimondo
  - Christ, Sitting at the Grave.
- Nancy, Musée des Beaux-Arts
  - Christ as Salvator Mundi.
- Neapel, Museo Nazionale di Capodimonti
  - St. Mary Magdalene in Prayer.
  - Mary with the child and Sts. John the Baptist and Jerome.
- New York, Metropolitan Museum of Art
  - Diana the Huntress.
- Oberlin, Allen Memorial Art Museum, Oberlin College
  - Cleopatra. around 1520 - 1540 (attributed)
- Ospedaletto Lodigiano, parish church
  - Mary with the Child and the Sts. Jerome and John the Baptist.
- Paris, Musée National du Louvre
  - The Death of Cleopatra by an Asp.
- Pavia, Curia Vescovile
  - Mary with the Child and Sts. Jerome and John the Baptist.
- Pavia Civic Museums
  - Magdalene
- Ponce, Museo di Arte de Ponce
  - St. John the Baptist. around 1530
- Ponte Capriasca, Sant' Ambrogio
  - Mary with the Child of Loretto with Sts. John the Baptist and Katharina of Alexandria.
- Portland, Oregon Portland Art Museum
  - St. Mary Magdalene. c. 1521; holding jar of oil
- Prague, Sternbersky Palace
  - St. Mary Magdalene
- Rome, Galleria Borghese
  - Mary with the Child.
- Rouen, Musée des Beaux Arts
  - Penitent St. Jerome
- Seattle, Seattle Art museum
  - Mary with the Child and St. John the Baptist. around 1510 - 1515
- San Francisco, Fine Arts museum
  - St. Catherine of Alexandria.
- St. Petersburg, Hermitage Museum
  - Mary with Child. around 1520 - 1530
  - Christ with the Symbol of the Holy Trinity
  - Praying St. Mary Magdalene.
  - St. John the Evangelist. (attributed)
- São Paulo, Museu de Arte
  - The Virgin Nursing the Child with St. John the Baptist in Adoration. around 1500 - 1520
- Turin, Galleria Sabauda
  - Christ, Carrying the Cross.
- Waco, Texas, Baylor University, Armstrong-Browning Library, Kress Collection
  - Christ, the Man of Sorrows. around 1540
- Washington, Howard University Gallery of Art
  - St. Mary Magdalene. around 1530 (attributed)

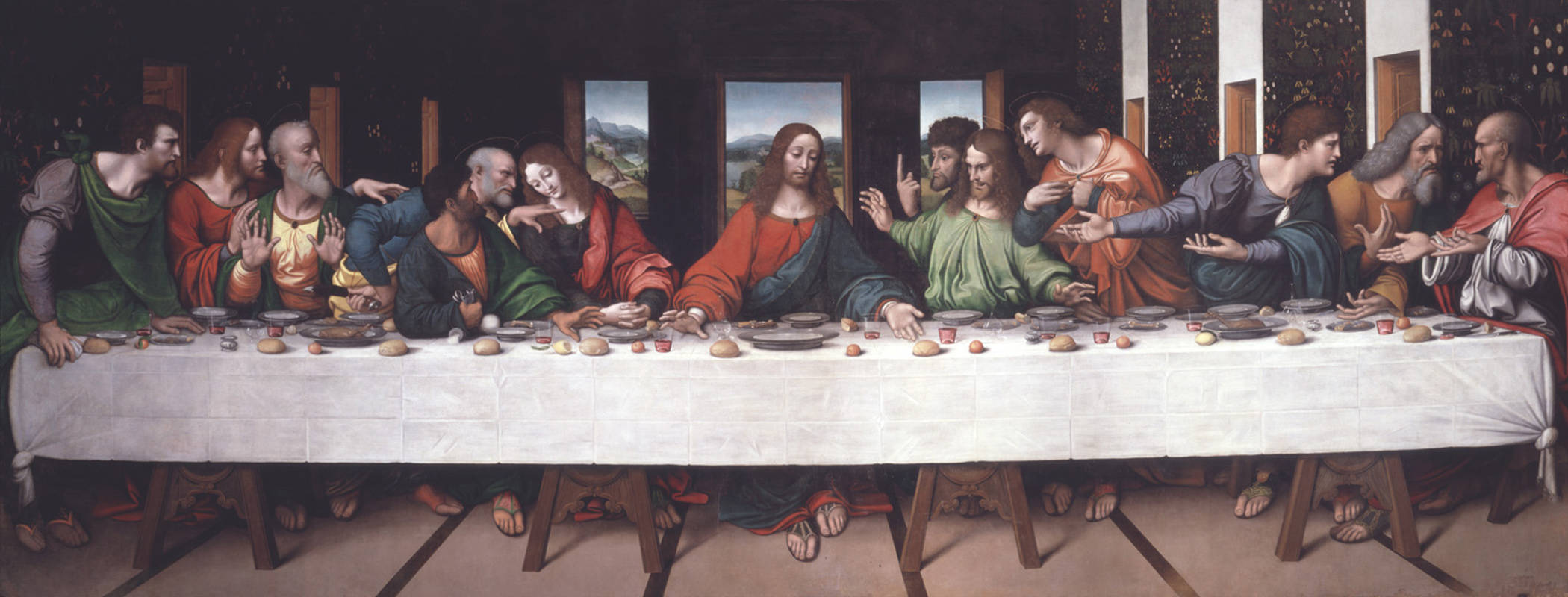
The Last Supper, ca. 1520, by Giampietrino, after Leonardo da Vinci, oil on canvas, in the collection of The Royal Academy of Arts, London; an accurate, full-scale copy of the original that was the main source for the twenty-year restoration of the original work (1978–1998)
