= Fernando Yáñez de la Almedina =

Spanish painter

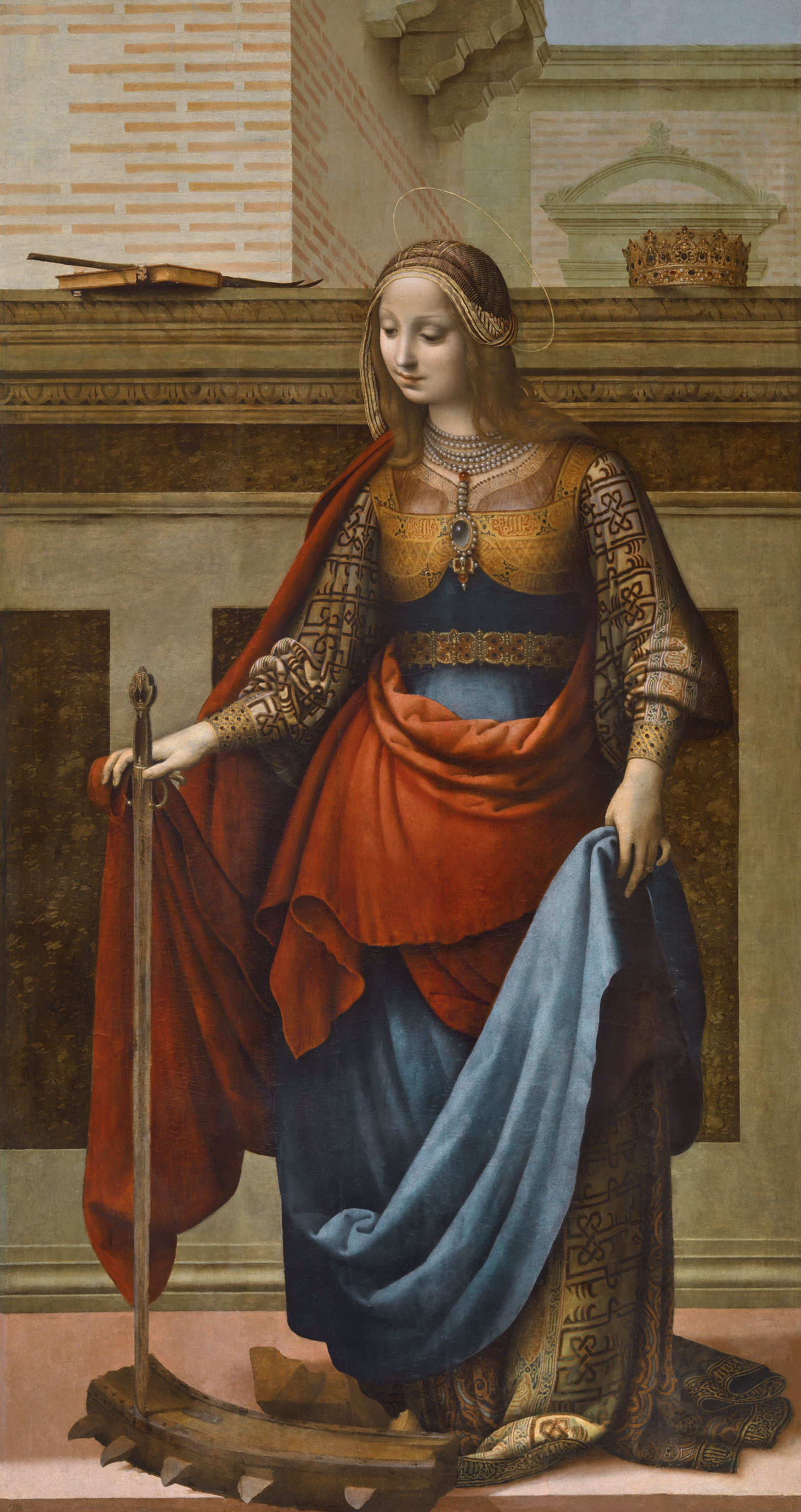
Saint Catherine of Alexandria, oil on canvas, c. 1510, in the Museo del Prado, Madrid, Spain

Fernando (or Hernando) Yáñez de la Almedina, born in Almedina, Spain in c. 1475 and died after 1537, was a Spanish painter. He was one of the most important early Renaissance painters in Spain. Of supposed morisco origin, he travelled to Italy to study fine art, and in the process became familiar with the work of Leonardo da Vinci. After returning to Spain, he collaborated with Hernando de los Llanos on many works.

== Selected works ==
- The Virgin with Child and Little (Infant) Saint John [the Baptist] (1505), held by the National Gallery of Art in Washington, DC
- Head of Christ (1506), held by the Metropolitan Museum of Art
- Saint Catherine of Alexandria (c. 1510), oil on canvas, held by the Museo del Prado.

== Bibliography (in Spanish) ==
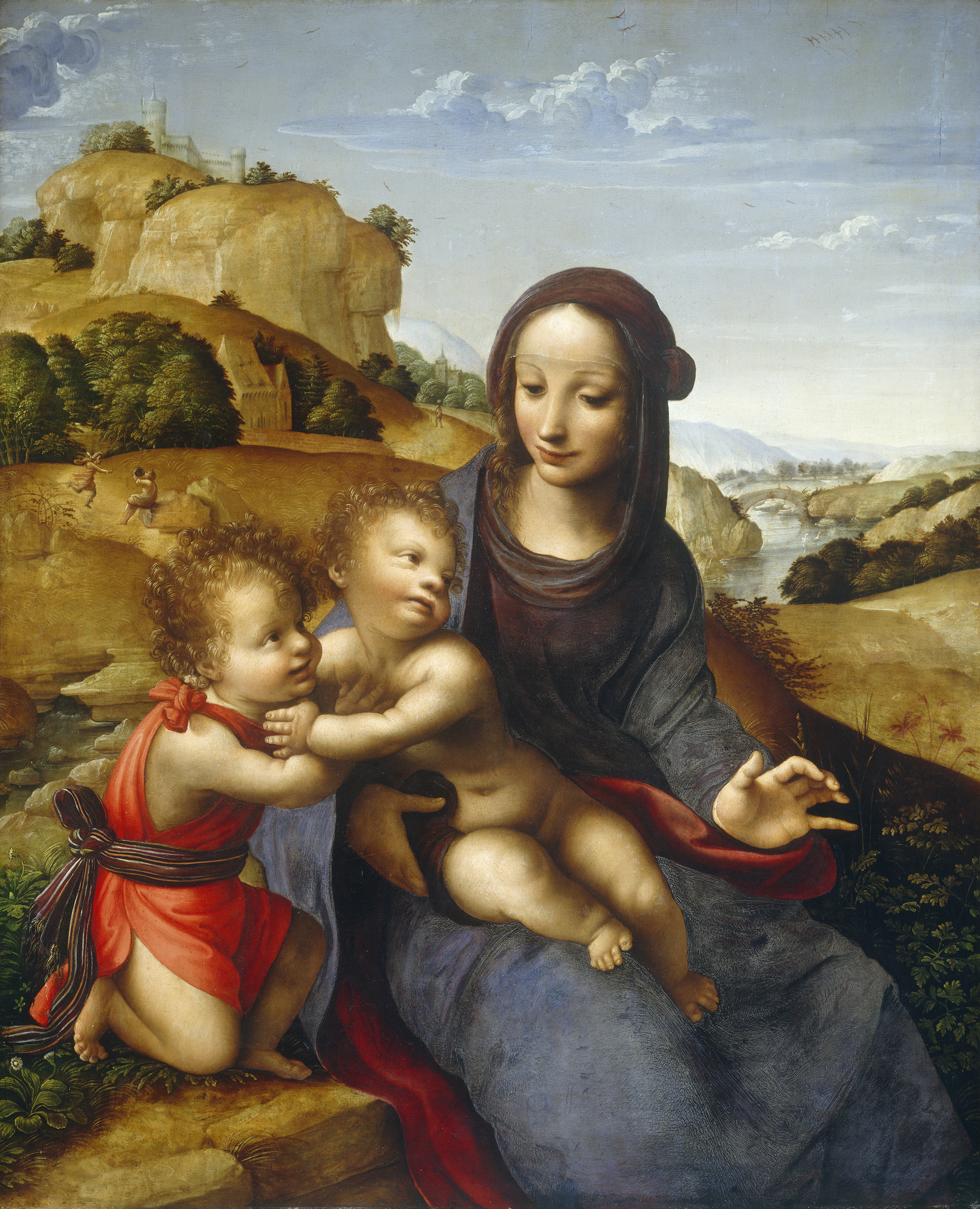
The Virgin with Child and Little (Infant) Saint John [the Baptist], 1505, in the National Gallery of Art, Washington, DC, United States

- Pedro Miguel Ibáñez Martínez, Fernando Yáñez de Almedina (Universidad de Castilla La Mancha, 1 January 1999)
- Museo Nacional del Prado, "Fernando Yáñez de la Almedina"
