= Salaì =

Italian artist (1480–1524)

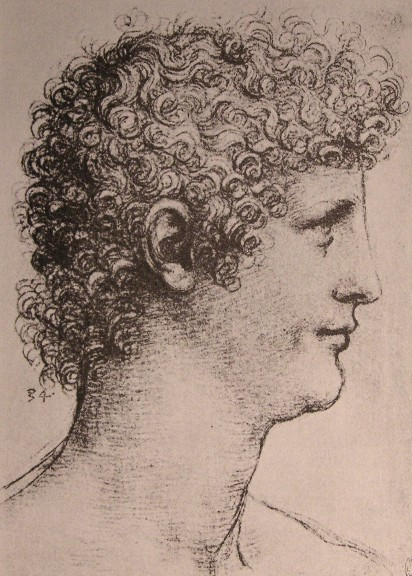
- Drawing thought to be Salaì by Leonardo da Vinci
- Born: Gian Giacomo Caprotti da Oreno; 1480; Oreno, Vimercate, Italy
- Died: 19 January 1524 (aged 43–44); Milan, Italy
- Notable work: Monna Vanna, Penitent Magdalene
- Movement: High Renaissance
- Spouse: Bianca Coldirodi d'Annono (m. 1523)
- Patrons: Leonardo da Vinci

Gian Giacomo Caprotti da Oreno, better known as Salaì (Note: Salaì is a contracted form of Saladino (Saladin). Leonardo da Vinci referred to Gian Giacomo by that nickname – since he was a child – as a joke, because he had a terrible temperament: As dangerous as the Saladin. As an infidel (because Saladin was not Catholic), and therefore by extension as a demon, or a "little devil".) (1480 – 19 January 1524), was an Italian artist and pupil of Leonardo da Vinci from 1490 to 1518. Salaì entered Leonardo's household at the age of ten. Salaì created paintings under the name of Andrea Salaì. He was described as one of Leonardo's students and lifelong companion and servant and was the model for Leonardo's St. John the Baptist, Bacchus, and Angelo incarnato.

== Early life ==
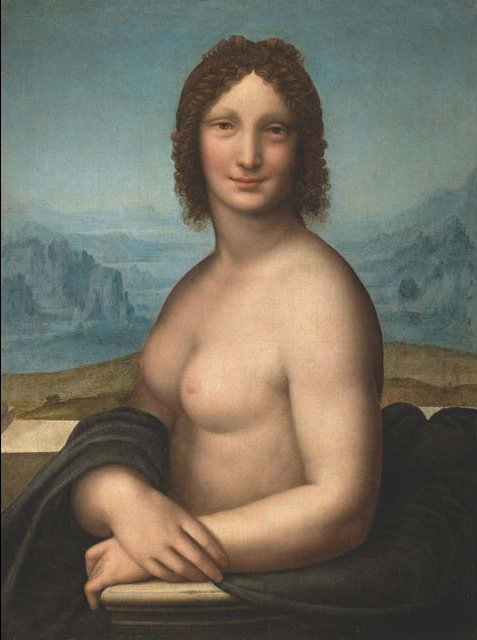
The Monna Vanna, a nude version of the Mona Lisa; both paintings are in the Louvre, Paris

Salaì was born in 1480 as son of Pietro di Giovanni, a tenant of Leonardo's vineyard near the Porta Vercellina, Milan.

Salaì joined Leonardo's household at the age of ten as an assistant. Giorgio Vasari describes Salaì as "a graceful and beautiful youth with curly hair, in which Leonardo greatly delighted". Although Leonardo described him as "a liar, a thief, stubborn, and a glutton" and he stole from Leonardo on at least five occasions, he kept Salaì in his household for more than 25 years, in which Salaì trained as an artist. Salaì became a capable, although not very impressive, painter, who created several works, including the Monna Vanna, a nude version of the Mona Lisa which may be based on a charcoal sketch by Leonardo. He is also considered to be a potential creator of the Prado's copy of the Mona Lisa. Walter Isaacson, an author, says in his opinion Leonardo had a homosexual relationship with Salaì. Leonardo is thought to have used Salaì as the model for several of his works, specifically St. John the Baptist, Bacchus and Angelo Incarnato. Some researchers also believe that Salaì–and not Lisa del Giocondo–was the real model for the Mona Lisa, but this claim is disputed by the Louvre.

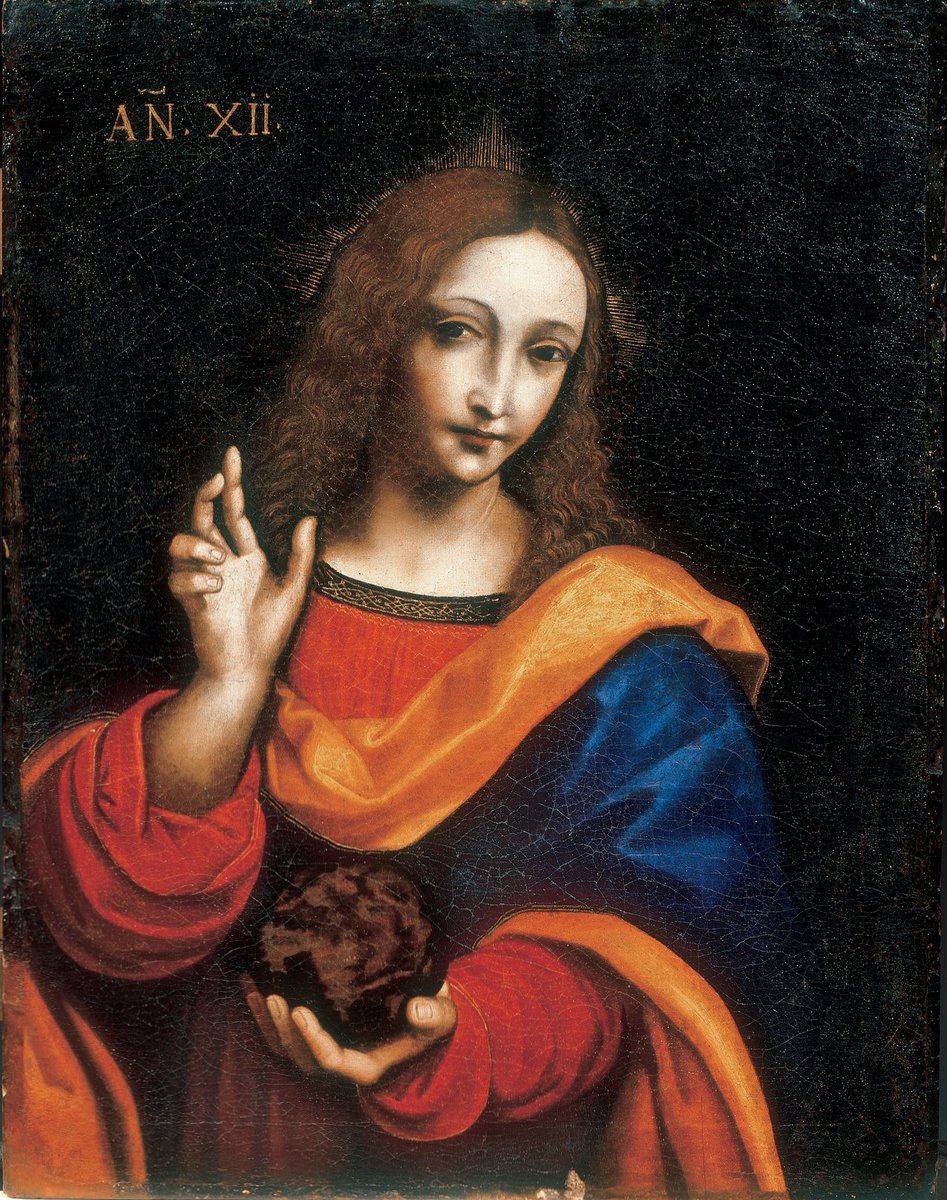
Cristo giovanetto come Salvator Mundi, Museo Ideale Leonardo da Vinci, in Vinci, Tuscany

During Leonardo's second stay in Milan, he took another young pupil, Francesco Melzi. Unlike Salaì, Francesco was a son of a nobleman. When Leonardo traveled to Rome in 1513 and to France in 1516, Salaì and Melzi both accompanied him. As an adult, Melzi became secretary and main assistant of Leonardo, and undertook to prepare Leonardo's writings for publication. Vasari wrote that Melzi "at the time of Leonardo was a very beautiful and very much loved young man". In France, Francesco Melzi was greeted as "Italian gentleman living with master Leonardo" and granted donation of 400 ecus, while Salaì, 36 years old, was described as "servant" and granted a one time donation of 100 ecus.

Salaì left France and Leonardo, in 1518. Salaì later returned to Milan to work on Leonardo's vineyard, previously worked by Salaì's father, half of which was granted to him in Leonardo's will. It is commonly believed that upon Leonardo's death in 1519, Salaì inherited several paintings including the Mona Lisa. Through his estate, many of those works, notably the Mona Lisa, passed into the possession of Francis I of France. While Leonardo left all personal belongings, paintings, drawings and notes to Francesco Melzi in his will, it is unclear whether this included the Mona Lisa.

On 14 June 1523, at age 43, Salaì married Bianca Coldirodi d'Annono. Salaì died in 1524 as a result of a wound received from a crossbow in a duel and was buried in Milan on 10 March 1524.

== Salaì's sexuality ==
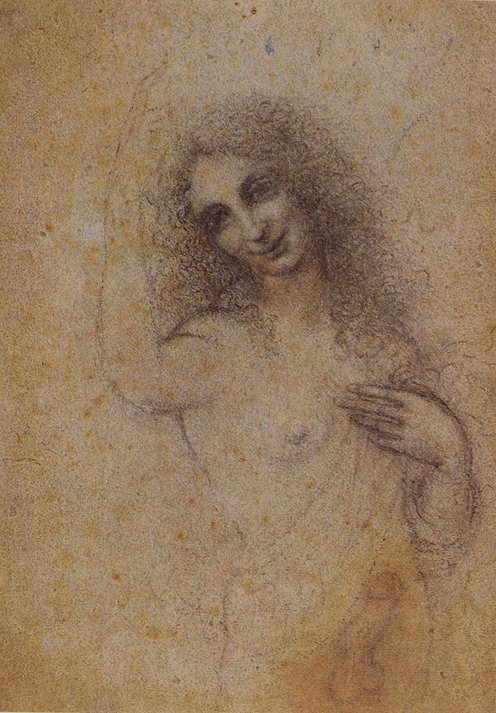
Angelo Incarnato, drawing of Salaì by Leonardo, c. 1515

A number of drawings among the works of Leonardo and his pupils make reference to Salaì's sexuality. There is a drawing modelled on Leonardo's painting John the Baptist and called The Angel Incarnate (Angelo incarnato), of a young man nude with an erect penis, and representing Salaì. It is accepted as by Leonardo's hand. The face of the figure is closer to Salaì's copy of Leonardo's painting John the Baptist, than to the original in the Louvre.

Leonardo‘s folio Codex Atlanticus includes two pages (132 and 133, verso) of drawings by a hand other than Leonardo's, one of which is a crudely drawn sketch depicting an anus, identified as "Salaì's bum", pursued by penises on legs.

Saint John the Baptist c. 1507–1516, (Note: Saint John the Baptist: Kemp (2019, p. 189): c. 1507–1514; Marani (2003, p. 340): c. 1508; Syson et al. (2011, p. 63): c. 1500 onwards; Zöllner (2019, p. 248): c. 1508–1516) Louvre. Leonardo is thought to have used Salaì as the model.

== Relationship to the Mona Lisa ==
A group of Italian researchers has claimed that Salaì was the model for the Mona Lisa, noting the similarity in some of the facial features, particularly the nose and mouth, to those in which Salaì is thought to have been the model. The claims have been disputed by the Louvre.

== In popular culture ==
=== Films ===
Films or TV series which are about the life of Leonardo or in which he appears as a character:

- The Life of Leonardo da Vinci (1972) interpreted by Bruno Piergentili
- Leonardo (2021) interpreted by Carlos Cuevas

=== Others ===
- Salaì is a principal character in the novel Cenacolo by Joseph Orbi.
- Paul McAuley's 1994 novel Pasquale's Angel is set in an alternate Italian Renaissance, Salaì is the main antagonist.
- DC Comics' 1995 Vertigo series Chiaroscuro: The Private Lives of Leonardo da Vinci (later published as a graphic novel) tells a speculative story of a love affair between Leonardo and Salaì.
- In a DLC of the 2010 video game Assassin's Creed: Brotherhood, Ezio (protagonist) interacts with Salaì when searching for Leonardo da Vinci. The game portrays Salaì as being Leonardo's lover and Ezio is aware of the relationship. He is supportive of it, telling Leonardo that he approves of his relationship.
- Giacomo is the main character in the novel Leonardo's Shadow by Christopher Grey.
- Salaì is the main character in the 1975 children's historical fiction novel The Second Mrs. Giaconda by E. L. Konigsburg.
- Salaì is a principal character with Leonardo in Mário Cláudio's 2014 Portuguese novel Retrato de Rapaz (Portrait of a Boy).
