= Cesare Bernazano =

Italian painter

Cesare Bernazano (active c. 1530) was an Italian painter of the Renaissance period. He was born in Milan, and painted still lifes with landscapes, animals, and fruit. The figures in his landscapes are generally painted by Cesare da Sesto. Francesco Vicentino was a pupil of his.
