= Angelo Incarnato =

Sketch by Leonardo da Vinci

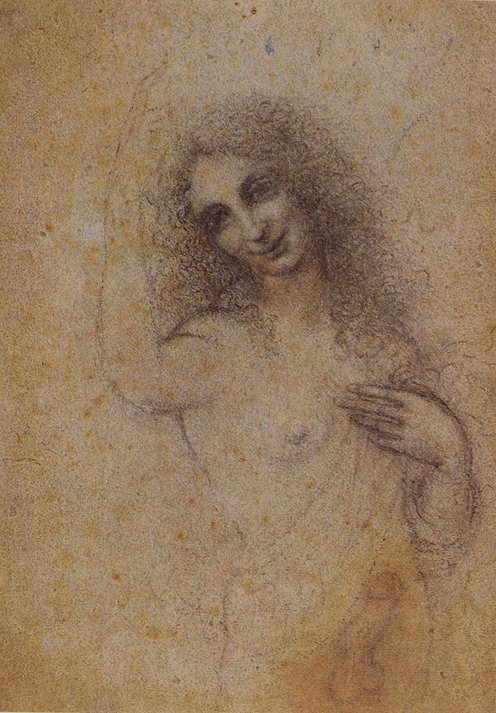
- Artist: Leonardo da Vinci (attributed)
- Year: Early 1500s
- Medium: Sketch
- Subject: Salaì

Angelo incarnato is a sketch attributed to the renowned Italian Renaissance artist Leonardo da Vinci. The drawing is believed to be a portrait of Leonardo's apprentice, Gian Giacomo Caprotti da Oreno, also known as Salaì. Salaì served as both a companion and model for Leonardo for over two decades, playing a key role in the artist's workshop.

== Description ==
The term Angelo Incarnato translates to "Embodied Angel," a title that reflects the idealized, almost divine beauty of the figure. The sketch exhibits the hallmark characteristics of Leonardo's style, including detailed anatomical precision, fluid lines, and soft shading that gives the figure a lifelike quality.

=== Pose ===
The subject has a graceful and gentle pose, similar to Leonardo's painting of St. John the Baptist. One hand is placed on the chest, while the other seems to be raised gently, giving the figure a calm and peaceful appearance. This pose makes the figure feel soft and elegant, almost as if they are in motion or quietly reflecting.

=== Hair ===
The figure has long, curly hair that flows around their face. The hair is soft and wild, giving the figure an almost magical, otherworldly look.

=== Smile ===
The smile is subtle and mysterious, with a gentle curve of the lips. It is the kind of smile that makes the viewer wonder what the figure is thinking, as it feels calm and secretive. This gives the figure a sense of wisdom or inner peace.

=== Genitals ===
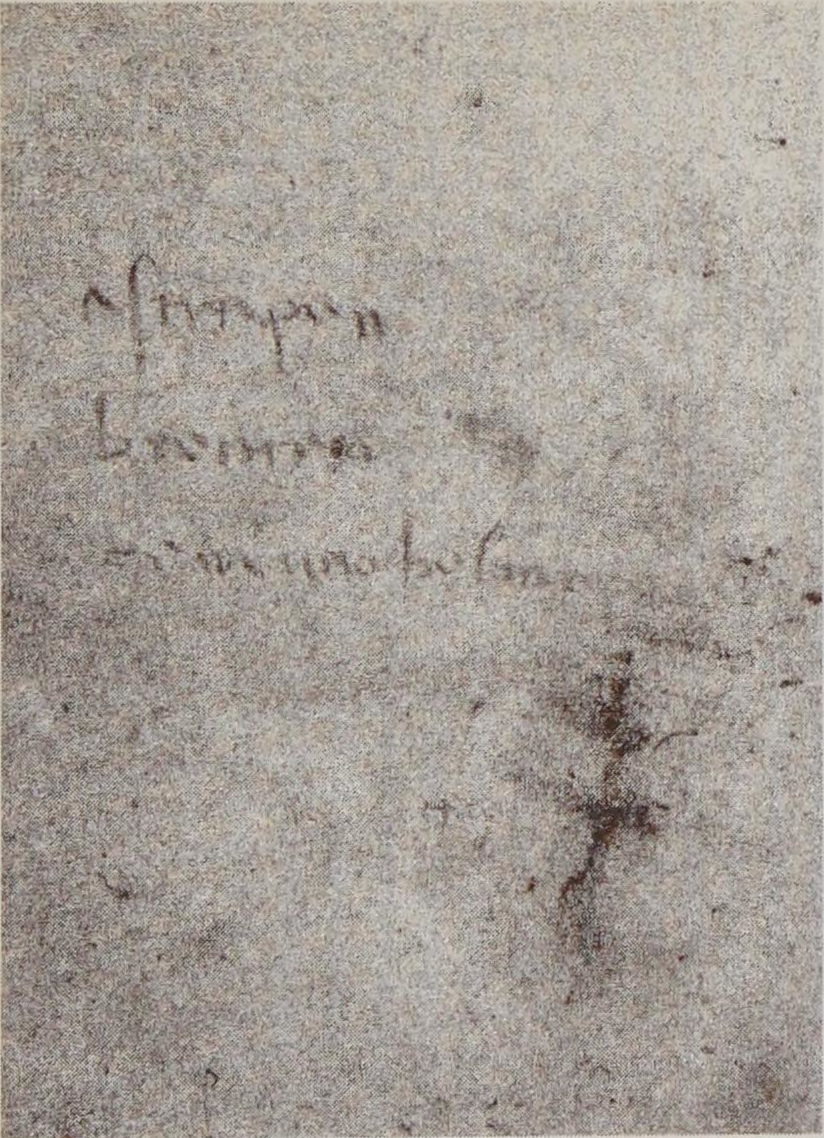
Words on reverse side: Lightning flash, thunder, thunderbolt

The figure's body shows a bare chest, and the lower part of the body depicts erect male genitalia. The mix of male and female characteristics makes the figure seem androgynous. This androgyny could suggest a deeper meaning, like a balance between both genders or a symbol of the human form that goes beyond physical features.

=== Reverse side (verso) ===
The reverse side contains the Greek words "lightning flash, thunder, thunderbolt". This is written in Leonardo da Vinci's distinctive handwriting.

== Attribution and debate ==
Though the drawing is often attributed to Leonardo da Vinci, some art historians have debated who actually made it. Some think Salaì himself may have drawn it, influenced by Leonardo's techniques. While the exact authorship is uncertain, the drawing is usually linked to Leonardo because of its style and quality.

== Salaì as the subject ==
Salaì entered Leonardo's workshop in 1490 and became his apprentice, model, and close companion. His youthful, almost angelic appearance made him a popular subject in Leonardo's works. Many believe that Salaì‘s face inspired other famous paintings by Leonardo, including possibly the Mona Lisa.
