= Salome with the Head of John the Baptist =

Salome with the Head of John the Baptist may refer to:

- Salome with the Head of John the Baptist (Caravaggio, London)
- Salome with the Head of John the Baptist (Caravaggio, Madrid)
- Salome with the Head of John the Baptist (Luini)
- Salome with the Head of John the Baptist by Jacob Cornelisz van Oostsanen; see 120 Paintings from the Rijksmuseum
- Salome with the Head of John the Baptist (Sebastiano del Piombo)
- The Head of Saint John the Baptist Presented to Salome by Peter Paul Rubens
- Salome with the Head of John the Baptist (Stom)

== See also ==
- Salome (disambiguation)
- Head of John the Baptist (disambiguation)
- Beheading of John the Baptist (disambiguation)
