= William Holwell Carr =

English priest, art dealer, art collector and painter

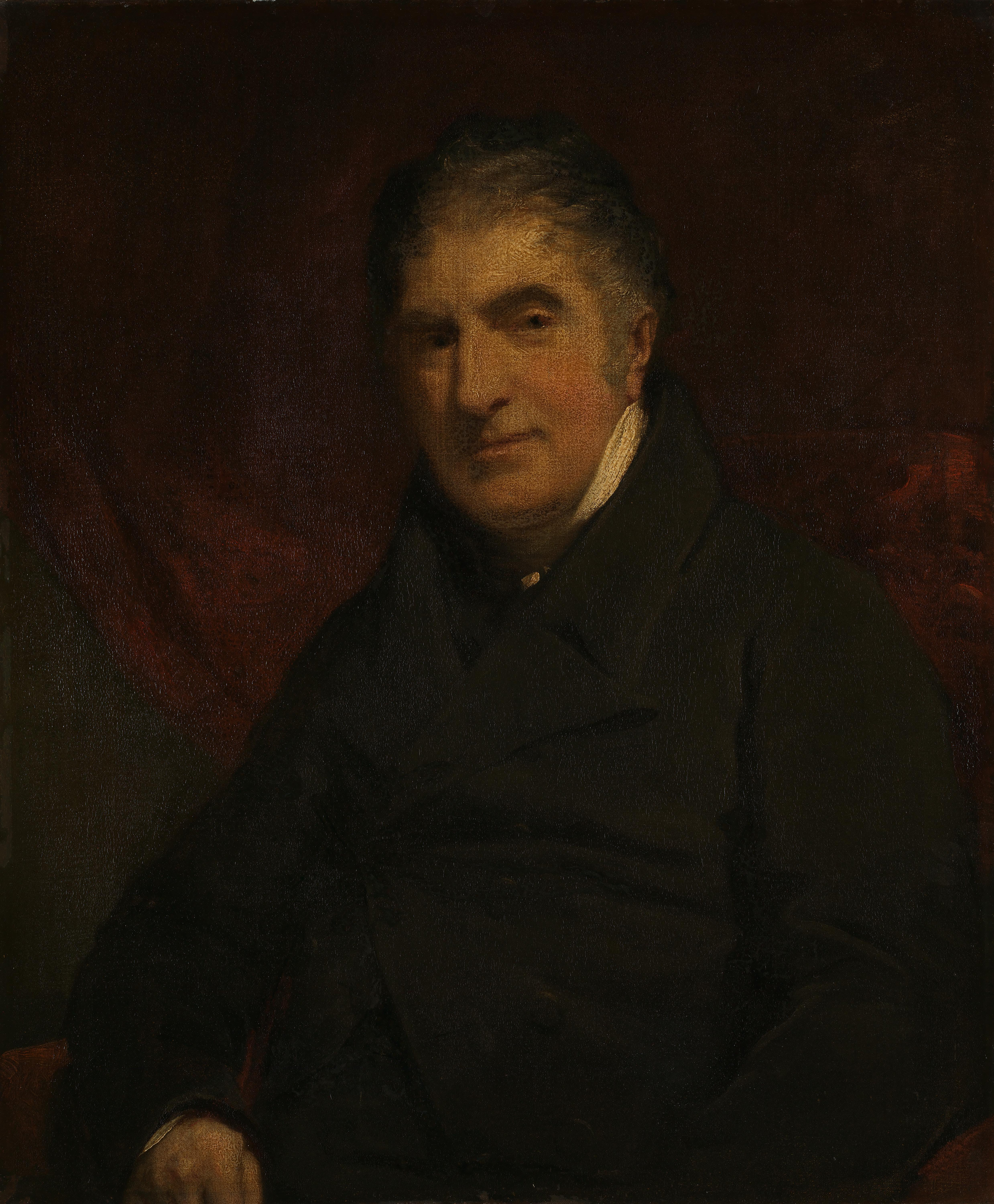
Portrait of Carr by John Jackson, 1827, now in the National Gallery, London.

The Reverend William Holwell Carr (1758–1830) was an English priest, art dealer, art collector and painter. His bequest of paintings was an important early addition to the collection of the National Gallery in London.

== Life ==
He was born William Holwell in Exeter, Devon, the son of Edward Holwell, an apothecary, and educated from 1776 at Exeter College, Oxford, where he graduated BA in 1783, MA in 1784 and BD in 1790, remaining as a Fellow until 1793, though apparently devoting most of his time on art.

In 1781 he was "allowed to travel" and went to Italy where he studied art and began the picture-buying which was to become his lifelong passion. In 1791 the rich benefice of Menheniot in Cornwall, in the gift of the Dean of Exeter College and only available to Fellows, fell vacant and he hastily took holy orders. He never lived there, paying a curate £100 per year to fulfil his duties for him, but his income from the living helped fund his art collecting. He lived at Devonshire Place at the top of Wimpole Street in London.

In 1797 he married Lady Charlotte Hay, daughter of James Hay, 15th Earl of Erroll and his wife Isabella, daughter of Sir William Carr of Etal. Charlotte inherited her maternal grandfather's property in Etal and the couple took the name Carr by royal consent. They had one son who died young.

Holwell Carr was a founding member of the British Institution in 1805 and of the Athenaeum Club. He practised landscape painting as an amateur and exhibited twelve untraced landscapes at the Royal Academy from 1804 and 1821 as an "Honorary Exhibitor", a designation used for gentleman amateurs. He was elected a Fellow of the Royal Society in 1806. He was sometimes accused of touching up paintings that passed through his hands. For a while he was part of a consortium organized by William Buchanan, and may have been in a partnership with the retired admiral William Waldegrave, 1st Baron Radstock. He seems to have been a difficult and rather unpopular figure, not beyond some rather sharp practice in his dealings, and "possessing the dreadful gift of total recall for past prices of works of art".

He died at Withycombe Raleigh, near Exmouth.

== Bequest ==
He bequeathed his entire collection of paintings to the nation. Shortly after his death the collection of thirty-five paintings was delivered to the National Gallery, London, then still housed in the Angerstein house in Pall Mall. Most of the works were Italian or French, including Saint George and the Dragon by Tintoretto, the Holy Family with a Shepherd by Titian, the Dead Christ Mourned by Two Angels by Guercino, and paintings by Guido Reni, Annibale Carracci, Canaletto, Rubens and many others; the bequest also included Carr's own portrait by Jackson. As with most collections of this date, not all the contemporary attributions are still accepted; in Carr's time the masterwork of the collection was thought to be the Christ Among the Doctors, which had long been called a Leonardo da Vinci, but is now attributed to Bernardino Luini, although the composition may be by Leonardo. He also left £500 to the poor of Menheniot. It was arguably the Holwell Carr Bequest that finally made it clear that the Government would have to build a more adequate home for the National Gallery.

Paintings in the Holwell Carr Bequest

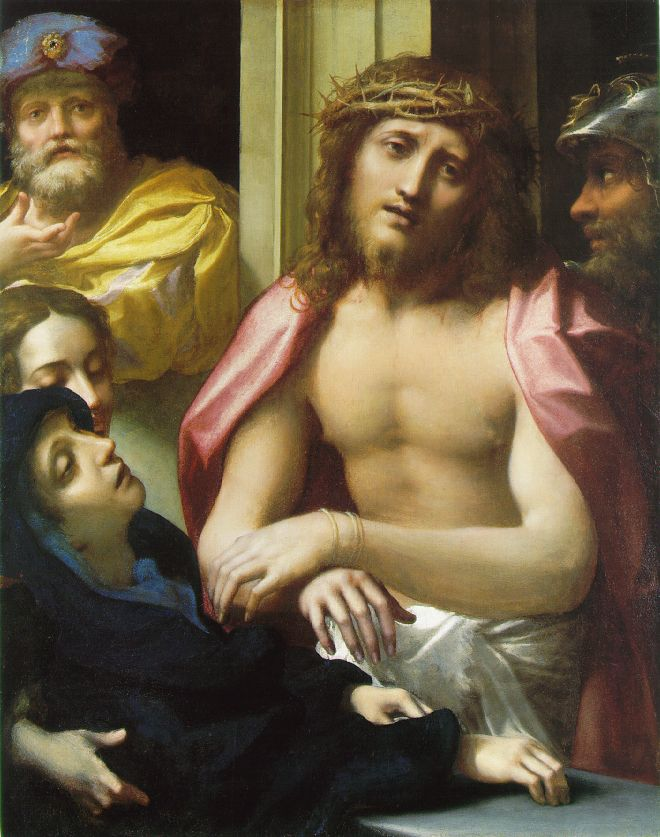
Ecce Homo, now thought after, not by Correggio

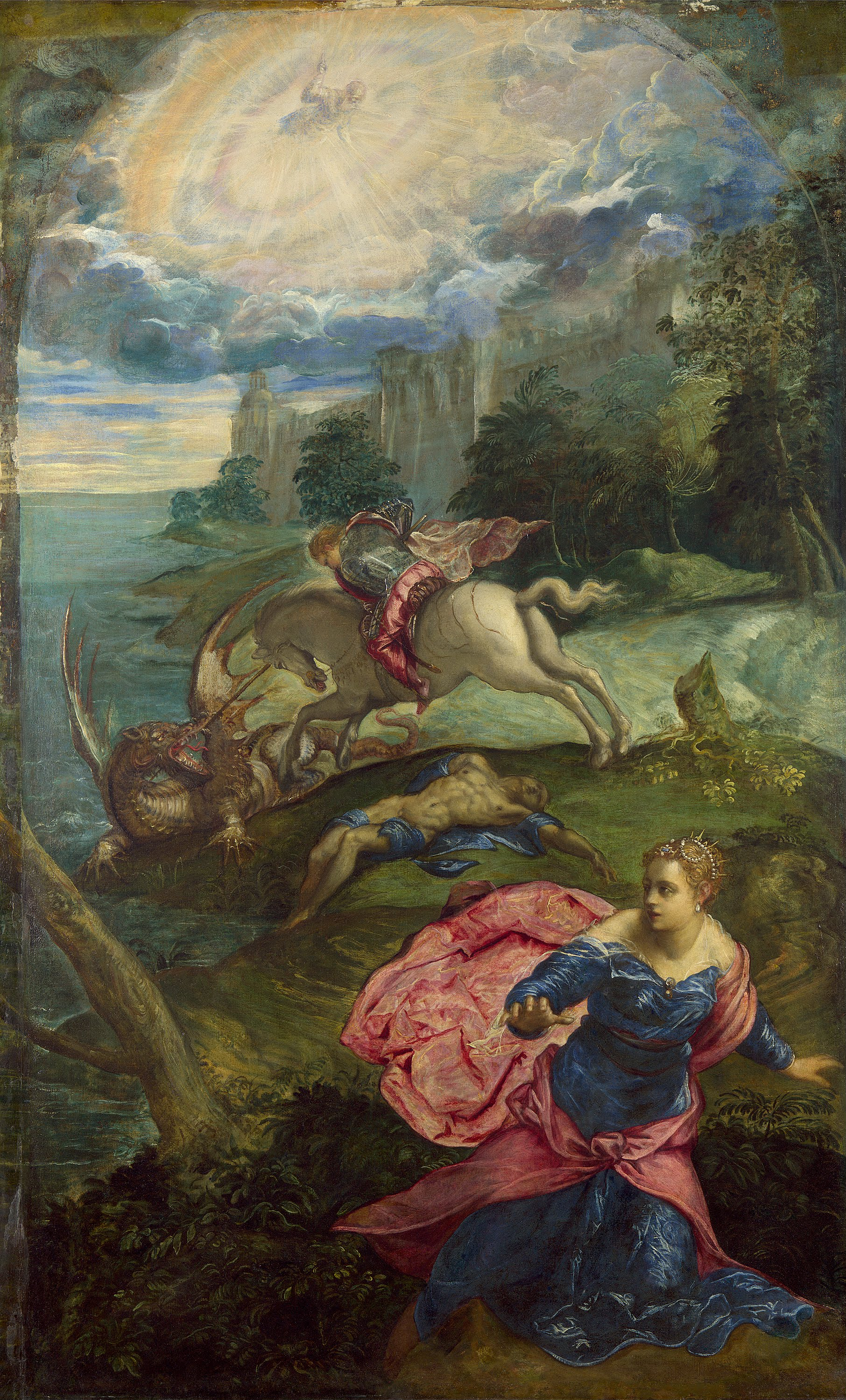
Saint George and the Dragon by Tintoretto

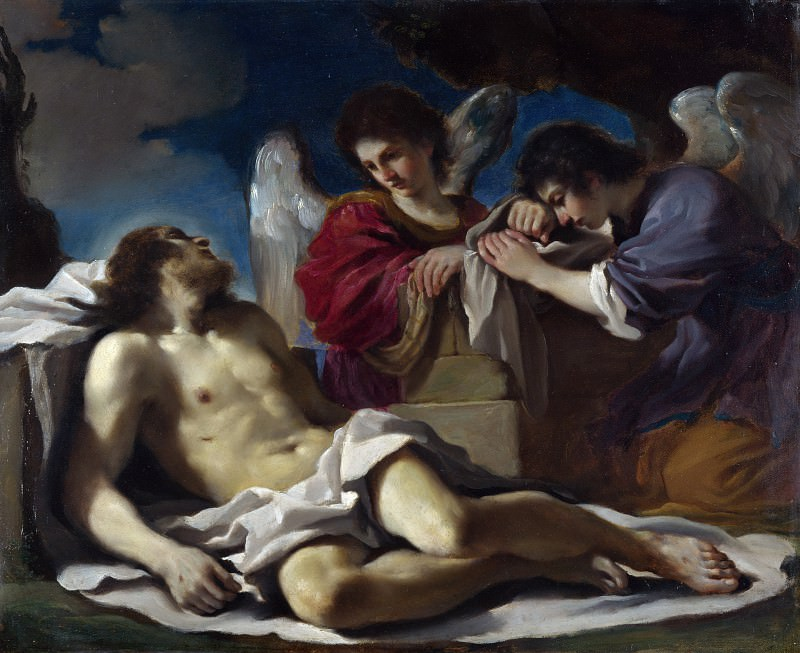
Dead Christ Mourned by Two Angels by Guercino

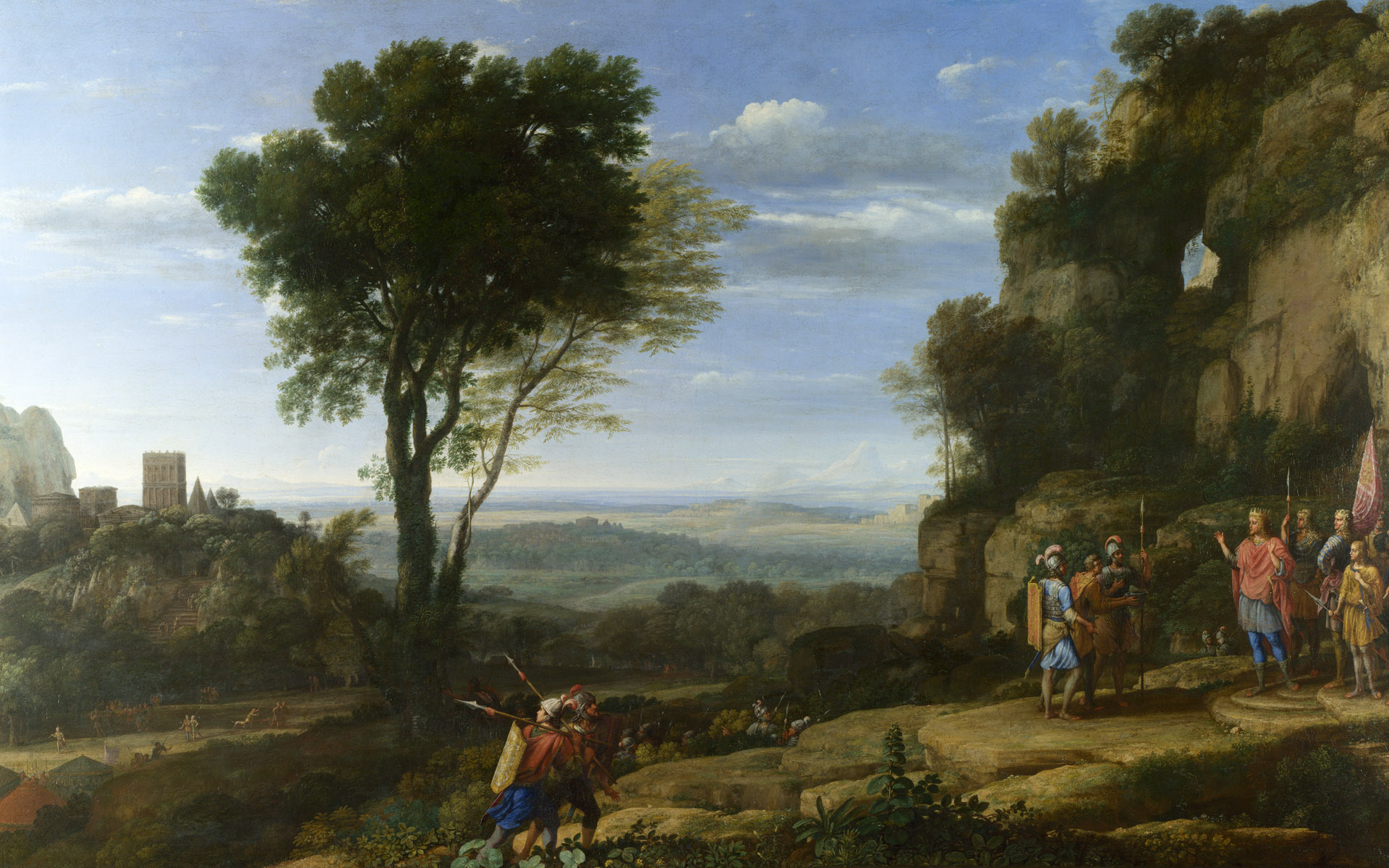
Landscape with David at the Cave of Adullam, 1658, Claude Lorrain
