= Head of John the Baptist (disambiguation) =

The beheading of John the Baptist is a biblical event commemorated as a holy day by various Christian churches.

Head of John the Baptist may also refer to:

- The Head of St John the Baptist (Bellini)
- Head of Saint John the Baptist (Rodin)
- The Head of John the Baptist (Solari)

== See also ==
- The Head of Saint John the Baptist Presented to Salome (Peter Paul Rubens)
- Beheading of John the Baptist (disambiguation)
- Salome with the Head of John the Baptist (disambiguation)
