= San Giovanni decollato =

San Giovanni decollato (or San Giovanni Battista Decollato) is Italian for "the beheaded Saint John" (Saint John the Baptist)

It may also refer to:

== Churches ==
- San Giovanni Battista Decollato, a church in Rome controlled by Florence, attached to the "Oratory of San Giovanni Decollato".
- San Giovanni Decollato, Pistoia
- San Giovanni Battista Decollato, Dosimo
- San Giovanni Battista Decollato, Montemurlo
- San Zan Degola, Venice (name in Venetian dialect)

== Other ==
- San Giovanni decollato, an Italian comedy film of 1940, in English Saint John, the Beheaded

== See also ==
- Beheading of John the Baptist (disambiguation)
