= Saint George and the Dragon (Tintoretto) =

Painting by Tintoretto

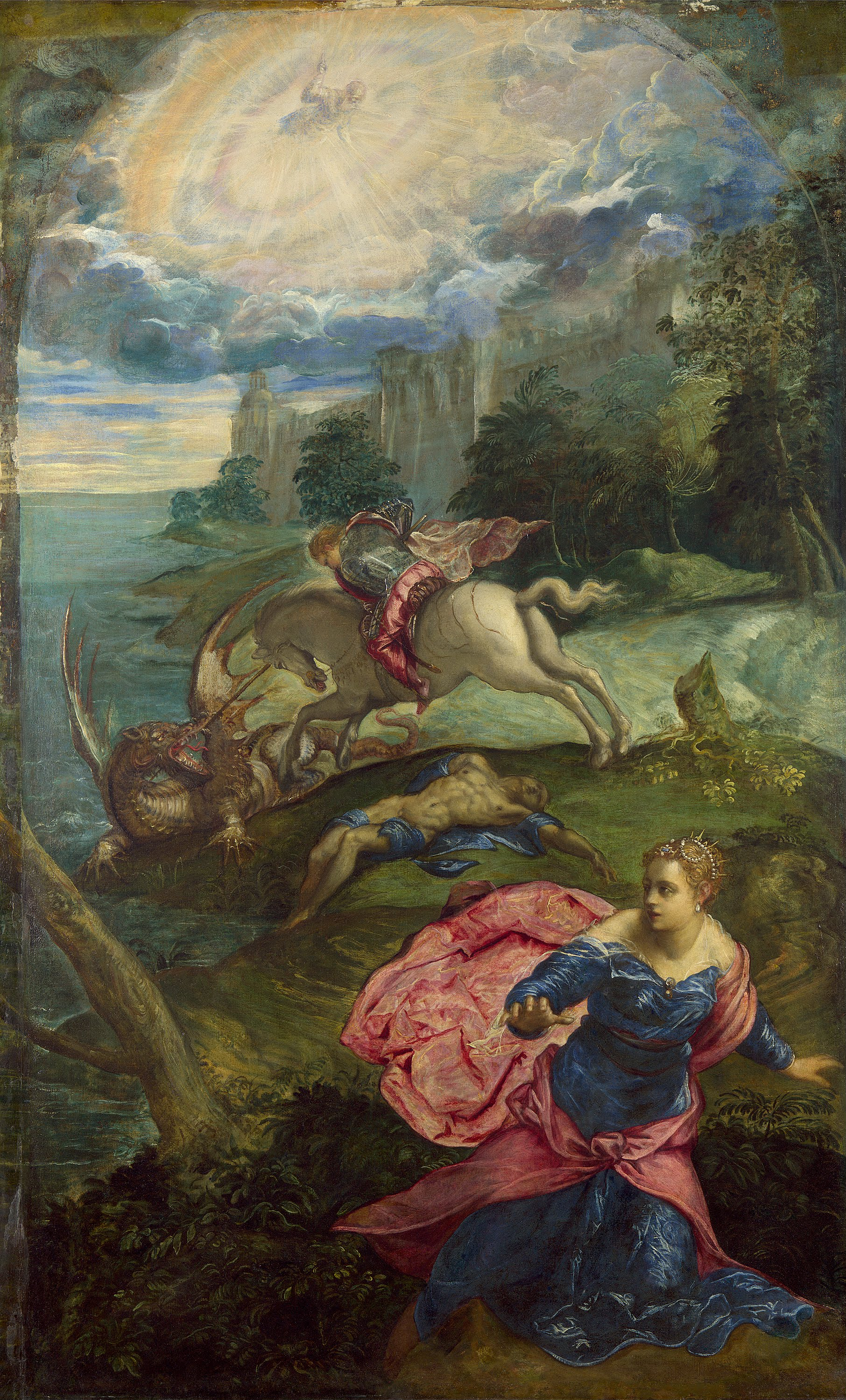
- Artist: Tintoretto
- Year: 1558
- Medium: Oil on canvas
- Dimensions: 157.5 cm × 100 cm (62.0 in × 39 in)
- Location: National Gallery; London

Saint George and the Dragon or Saint George Killing the Dragon is a 1555 or 1558 painting by the Venetian artist Tintoretto. It was acquired by the English collector William Holwell Carr, who bequeathed it to the National Gallery, where it now hangs.

== Description and analysis ==
The slaying of the dragon by Saint George was a popular motif for early painters. The legend relates how the city of Silene in Libya was being terrorised by a dragon and the townspeople eventually forced to provide it with a supply of victims chosen by lot. On the occasion portrayed in the picture the King's daughter had been chosen and sent to her death dressed as a bride. By chance Saint George arrived on horseback and killed or wounded the beast with his lance, allowing the princess to escape.

Tintoretto's composition is unusual in that the viewer's eye is drawn to the foreground figure of the escaping princess with her bright pink cloak or to the bright heavenly light in the sky giving divine blessing for the deed. St George himself, in the very act of spearing the dragon, is consigned to the background. in the middleground lies the dead body of a previous victim, lying as if crucified, possibly a warning that his death would be avenged.

== See also ==
- Saint George and the Dragon - history of the legend of Saint George.
- Saint George and the Dragon (disambiguation) - other paintings based on the legend
