= Francesco Granacci =

Italian painter (1469–1543)

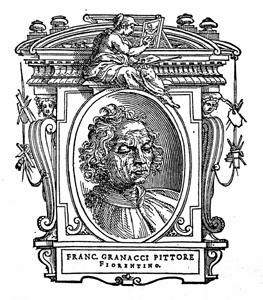
Illustration of Francesco Granacci from Le Vite by Giorgio Vasari, edition of 1568

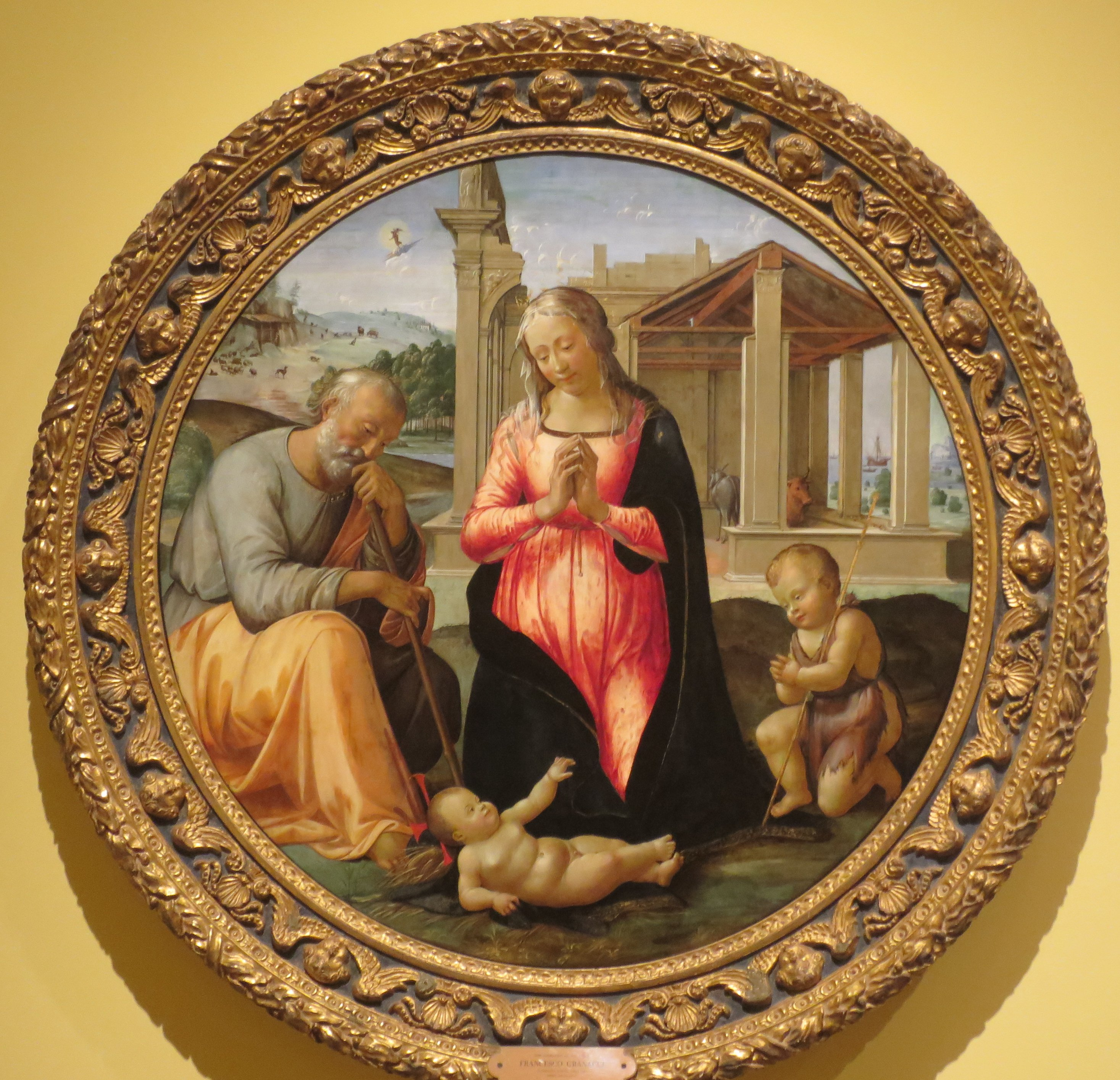
Nativity, late 1490s. Honolulu Museum of Art

Francesco Granacci (1469 – 30 November 1543) was an Italian Renaissance painter active primarily in his native Florence. Though little-known today, he was regarded in his time and is featured in Giorgio Vasari's Lives of the Artists.

Granacci was born in 1469 in Villamagna, and was trained in Florence in the workshop of Domenico Ghirlandaio, where he became lifelong friends with Michelangelo. The two frequented Lorenzo de' Medici's famous sculpture garden near the convent of San Marco. His earliest works, such as the Madonna and Child with Saints Michael and John the Baptist (Staatliche Museen, Berlin), Adoration of the Child (Honolulu Museum of Art) and his panel from the four histories of Saint John the Baptist (Metropolitan Museum of Art, New York) show the strong influence of Ghirlandaio as well as Filippino Lippi, who might have been Granacci's first master. According to Vasari, when Granacci was still a youth he modeled for the nude figure in Filippino's Raising of Theophilus in the Brancacci Chapel.

In 1508 Granacci went to Rome, where he and other artists, including Agnolo di Domenico del Mazziere, were asked to help Michelangelo with the Sistine Chapel ceiling. On his return to Florence, he painted a number of altarpieces and other important works, like the Madonna with Child with Saints Francesco and Jerome for the Augustinian convent of San Gallo or the Assumption of the Virgin for Santi Girolamo e Francesco sulla Costa (both now at the Galleria dell'Accademia). In 1515 he participated in the decorations celebrating Pope Leo X's visit to Florence. In 1519 he completed a large panel of the Virgin and Child with Saint John the Baptist, now at the Museum of Western and Eastern Art in Odessa.

Granacci's works from the years 1520–1525 show some similarities to the work of Fra Bartolomeo. For example, his Madonna and Child with Saints Sebastian and Francis at the Museo di Santa Verdiana in Castelfiorentino is more dynamic and dramatic than his earlier works. The same can be said of his Madonna and Child with Four Saints (1521) at San Giovanni Battista Decollato, Montemurlo, near Prato. In 1527, Granacci painted the Entry of Charles VIII into Florence (Uffizi, Florence) and an altarpiece of the Ten Thousand Martyrs for the Church of San Simone e Giuda in Florence. In 1530 he completed the high altarpiece for the church of Sant'Apollonia, Florence; according to Vasari, this work was designed by Michelangelo. Its four main panels, depicting Saints Jerome, Apollonia, John the Baptist and Mary Magdalen, are at the Alte Pinakothek, Munich; a central Annunciation is at Corsham Court and the ten-part predella is now divided between the Accademia in Florence, the Villa I Tatti in Florence and a private collection.

Granacci died in 1543. He is buried in the church of Sant'Ambrogio in Florence.

== Sources ==
- Holst, Christian von. Francesco Granacci, Munich: Bruckmann, 1974.
- Markova, Vittoria. “Una tavola data di Francesco Granacci e qualche nota sul percorso,” Mitteilungen des Kunsthistorichen Institutes in Florenz, 37, Bd., H. 2/3 (1993): pp. 293–302.
- Aquino, Lucia and Giordani, Simone, eds. Francesco Granacci e Giovanni Larciani all’Oratorio di Santa Caterina all’Antella. Florence: Polistampa, 2013.

== Gallery ==
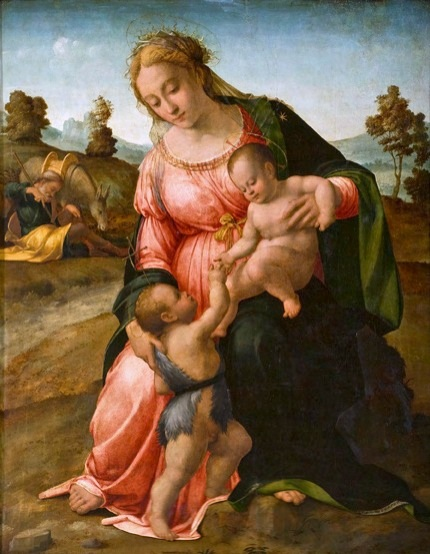
Madonna and Child with St. John the Baptist, circa 1505–1510. Ponce, Museo de Arte de Ponce.

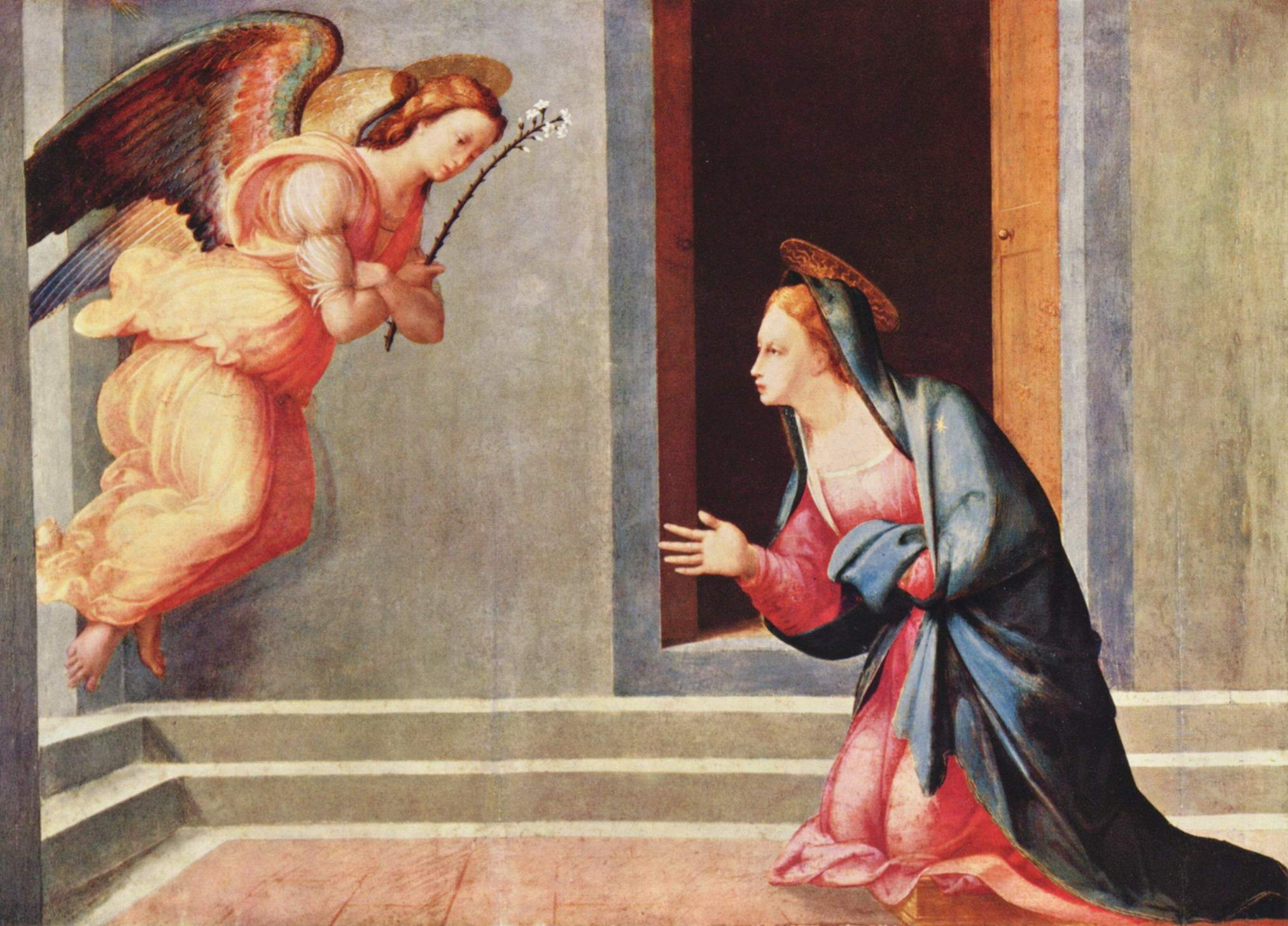
The Annunciation, late 1520s. Corsham Court (Wiltshire), Methuen Collection.

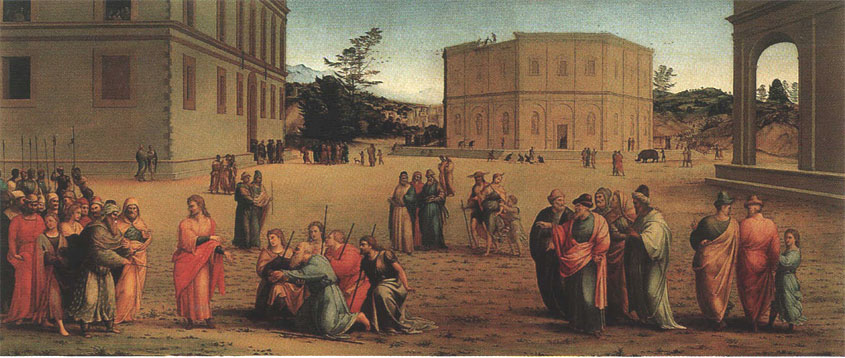
Joseph Presents his Father and Brothers to the Pharaoh, circa 1516. Florence, Gallerie degli Uffizi.
