= Ham Mocking Noah =

Painting by Bernardino Luini

- Lo scherno di Cam (Italian)
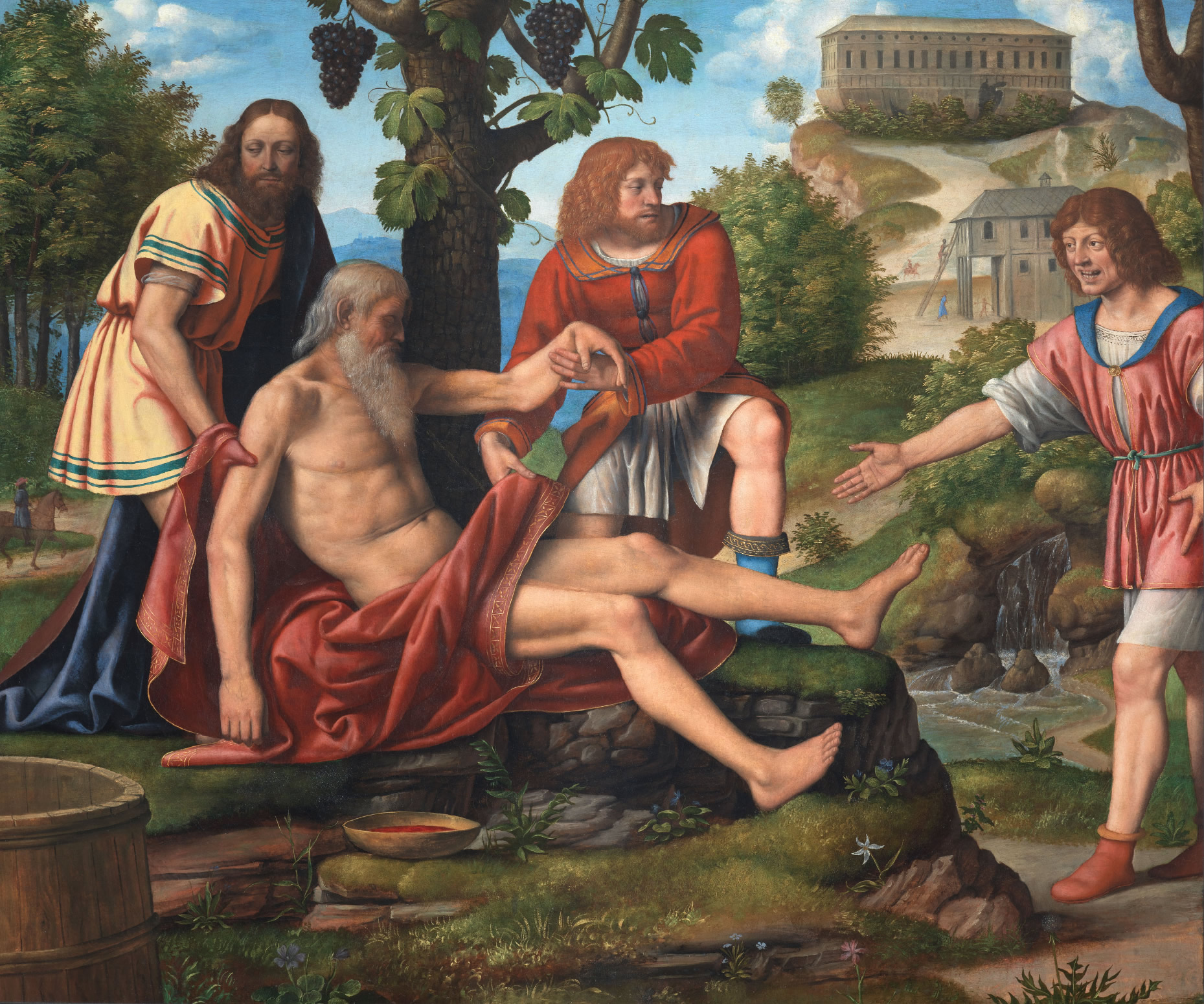
- Artist: Bernardino Luini
- Year: c. 1510-1515
- Medium: Oil on panel
- Dimensions: 116 cm × 140 cm (46 in × 55 in)
- Location: Pinacoteca di Brera, Milan

Ham Mocking Noah is an oil on panel painting by Italian artist Bernardino Luini, from c. 1510-1515. It is held in the Brera Gallery, in Milan.

== Subject ==
The subject is the episode told in the Old Testament when Noah got drunk. Shem and Japheth averted their eyes from their father's nudity, and covered him, but Ham mocked him. The story is found in Genesis 9.

And Noah began to be a husbandman, and he planted a vineyard. And he drank of the wine and was drunken, and was uncovered within his tent. And Ham saw the nakedness of his father. And Shem and Japheth took a garment, and laid it on both of their shoulders, and covered the nakedness of their father.

— Genesis 9:20-23

The story is illustrated in many Biblia Pauperum and the Speculum Humanae Salviationis.

It is also illustrated in the Great East Window of York Minster, and the Tudor stained glass of Kings College Chapel - of a very similar date to the painting (tenth window, upper right).

By the medieval period much thought had been given to the story and the Egerton Genesis includes expository material, some of it dating back to Origen. In 1519 both of Martin Luther's sermons dealt with the analogy between Ham mocking Noah and the Jews mocking Christ.

== See also ==
- Curse of Ham
