= Saint George and the Dragon (disambiguation) =

Saint George and the Dragon is a medieval legend.

Saint George and the Dragon may also refer to:

== Paintings ==
- Saint George and the Dragon (Raphael), Washington, NGA, 1506, oil-on-wood
- St. George (Raphael, Louvre), also known as St. George and the Dragon, an oil-on-wood painting of c. 1504
- Saint George and the Dragon (Rubens), 1620s, oil-on-canvas
- Saint George and the Dragon (Martorell), 1434–1435, tempera-on-panel
- Saint George and the Dragon (Uccello), 1470, oil-on-canvas
- Saint George and the Dragon (Tintoretto), 1555 or 1558, oil-on-canvas
- St. George and the Dragon (Carpaccio), tempera-on-panel, 1504
- Saint George and the Dragon (Farleigh Hungerford Castle), between 1430 and 1445

== Other media ==
- Saint George and the Dragon (Notke), a 15th-century wooden sculpture by Bernt Notke
- "St. George and the Dragon" (song), a 1979 rock song
- Saint George and the Dragon (book), a 1984 children's picture book
- St. George and the Dragon (ballad), a 17th-century ballad
- St. George and the Dragon alternate title for The Magic Sword (1962 film)

== See also ==
- George and Dragon (disambiguation)
- George and the Dragon (disambiguation)
- "St. George and the Dragonet"
- St. George Shoots the Dragon
- Category:Saint George and the Dragon
- St. George Dragons
  - St. George Illawarra Dragons
