= George and the Dragon =

George and the Dragon may refer to:

- George and the Dragon (Efteling), a wooden roller coaster
- George and the Dragon (TV series), a British television sitcom broadcast between 1966 and 1968
- Saint George and the Dragon, a medieval legend
- George and the Dragon (2004 film), a film released in 2004 starring James Purefoy

== See also ==
- George and Dragon (disambiguation)
- Saint George and the Dragon (disambiguation)
- The Dragon and the George
