= George and Dragon =

George and Dragon may refer to:

- George and Dragon, Cheadle, a listed pub in Greater Manchester, England
- George and Dragon, Fitzrovia, a listed pub in London
- George and Dragon, Great Budworth, a listed pub in Cheshire, England
- George and Dragon, Kirkbymoorside, a listed pub in North Yorkshire, England
- George and Dragon, Leigh, a listed pub in Greater Manchester
- George and Dragon, Salisbury, a listed pub in Wiltshire, England
- George and Dragon, Swanscombe, a former inn in Kent, England
- The George Inn, Southwark, a listed pub in London, established as the George and Dragon in the medieval period
- A comic strip in The Dandy

== See also ==
- George and the Dragon (disambiguation)
- Saint George and the Dragon (disambiguation)
