= Beheading of John the Baptist (disambiguation) =

The beheading of John the Baptist is a biblical event commemorated as a holy day by various Christian churches.

The title may also refer to:

- The Beheading of St John the Baptist (Caravaggio)
- Beheading of John the Baptist (Damaskinos)
- The Beheading of Saint John the Baptist (Giovanni di Paolo)
- Feast of Herod with the Beheading of St John the Baptist (Bartholomeus Strobel the Younger)

== See also ==
- San Giovanni decollato (disambiguation)
- Head of John the Baptist (disambiguation)
- Salome with the Head of John the Baptist (disambiguation)
