= Ecce Homo (Luini) =

Painting by Bernardino Luini

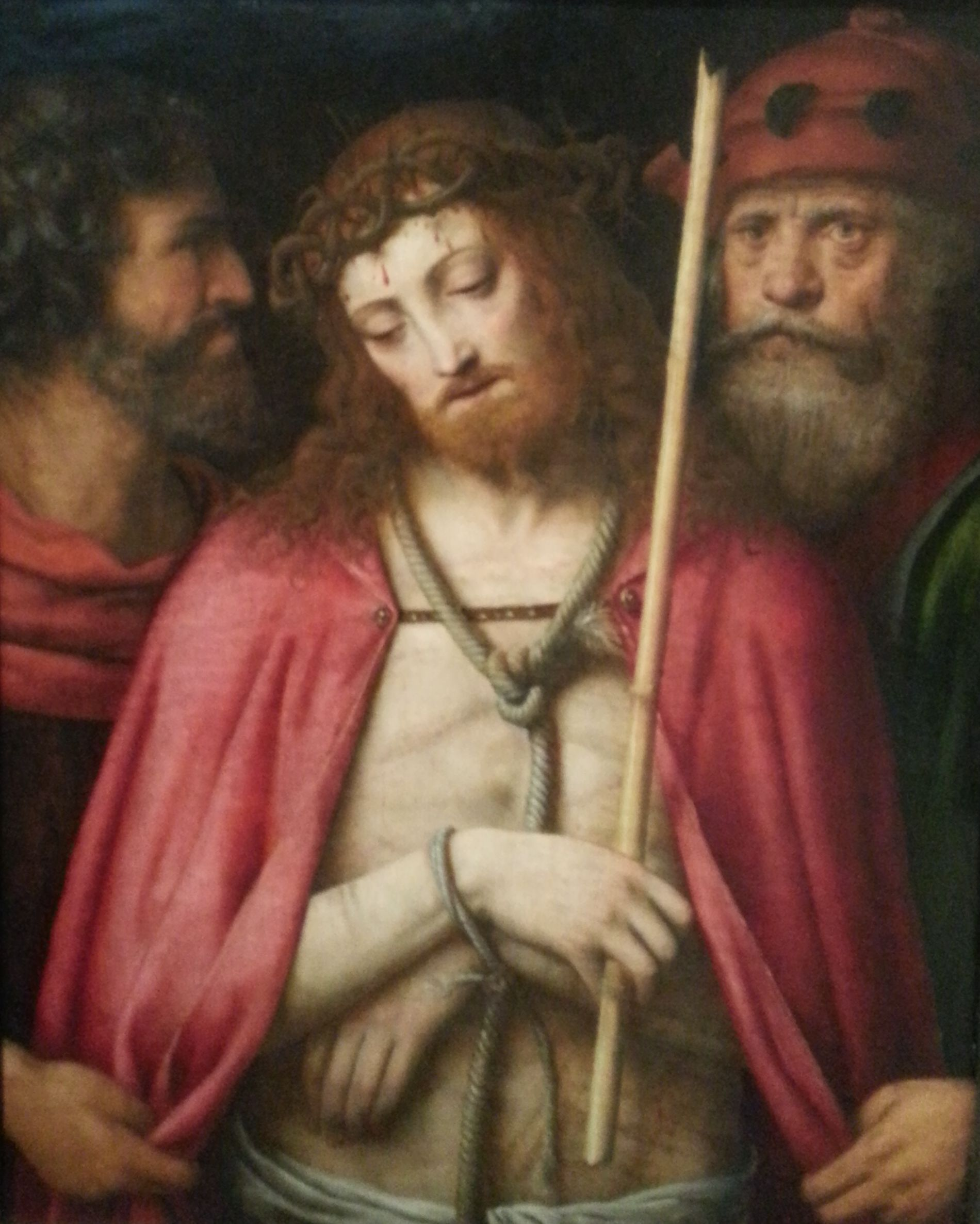
- Artist: Bernardino Luini
- Year: c. 1500-1532
- Medium: Oil on panel
- Dimensions: 71.5 cm × 56.7 cm (28.1 in × 22.3 in)
- Location: Wallraf-Richartz Museum, Cologne

Ecce Homo is an oil-on-panel painting executed c. 1500–1532 by the Italian Renaissance artist Bernardino Luini, now in the Wallraf-Richartz Museum in Cologne. Kurl Badt previously misattributed it to Andrea Solario, but Federico Zeri restored the correct attribution in 1971.

== Description and analysis ==
Jesus Christ is depicted in a close-up, shown from the waist up. His head is crowned with thorns, while the hands are tied with a rope, and a noose is placed around his neck. Two men, opening the purple mantle as if it were a curtain, discover the white tortured body with the signs of the beatings.

The three characters gazes do not meet: Jesus, who is holding a rod used by the executioners in his hand, bends his head slightly to the right and looks downwards; the man on the left looks at the older man on the right, who stares sternly at the viewer.

The pictorial quality, especially of the delicate, suffering face of Jesus, is indicative of Leonardo da Vinci's influence.
