= Villa La Pelucca frescoes =

Painting by Bernadino Luini

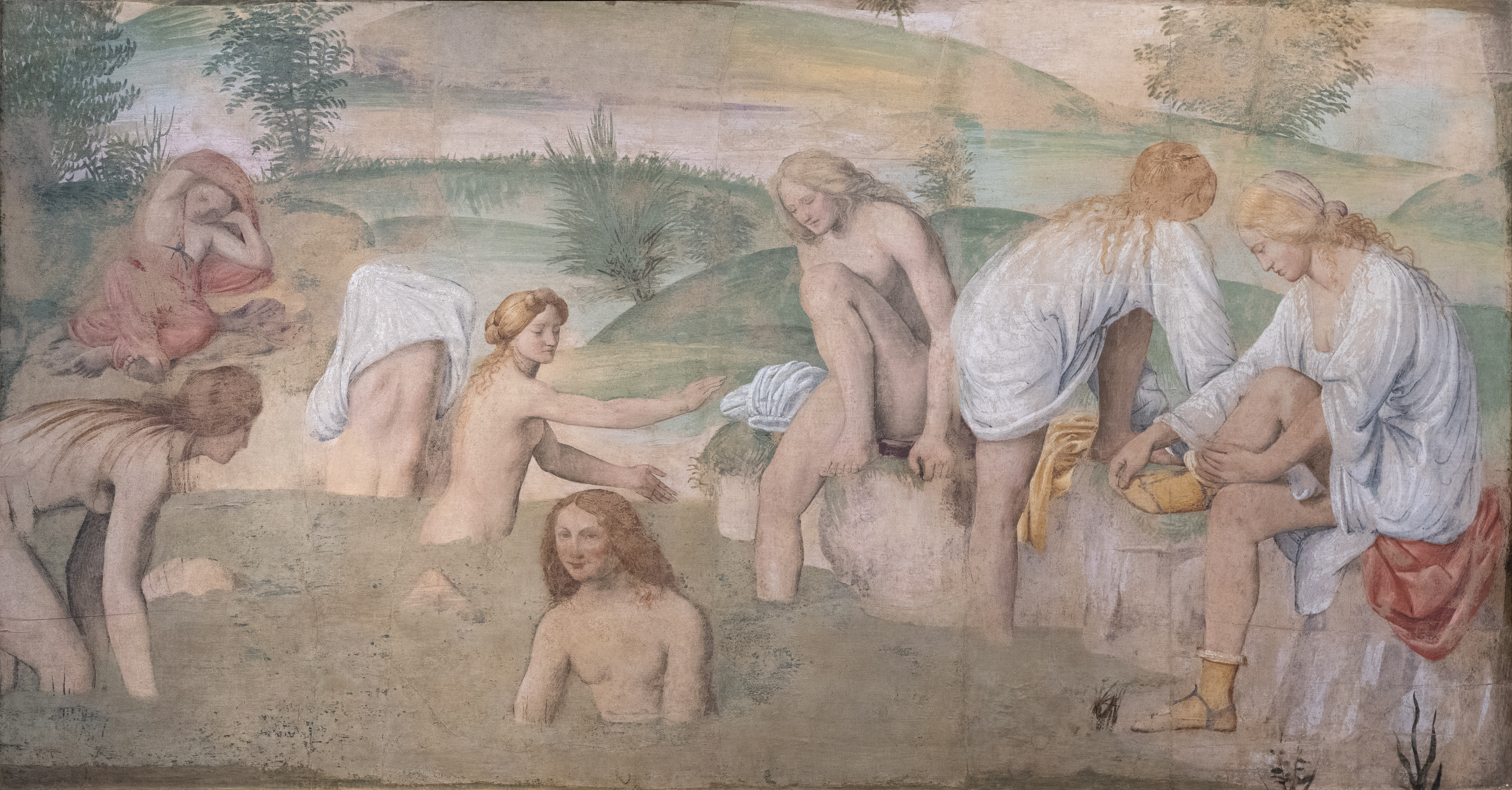
- Artist: Bernardino Luini
- Year: c. 1520-1523
- Medium: Fresco

The Villa La Pelucca frescoes are a c. 1520–1523 cycle of frescos by Bernardino Luini, commissioned by the Milanese nobleman Gerolamo Rabia for his villa near Monza, known as 'La Pelucca'. Most of the surviving fragments are in the Pinacoteca di Brera in Milan, though others are in the Wallace Collection in London, the Louvre in Paris, the Musée Condé in Chantilly and other private collections. Stylistically they shown the influence of Bramantino - Women Bathing the figure's shoulders is a homage to the Trivulzio Tapestries, particularly February from that cycle.

== History ==
In the Napoleonic era the villa was used by viceroy Eugene de Beauharnais, before passing into the lands of the Kingdom of Lombardy–Venetia in 1816. Shortly after that it was sold to private owners. The frescoes were removed between 1821 and 1822 by Stefano Barezzi, who transferred them to canvas supports, leading to several cracks which are still visible. Vast pieces of the cycle are lost, particularly those relating to the framing architecture, irredeemably altering the legibility of the cycle.

== Gallery ==
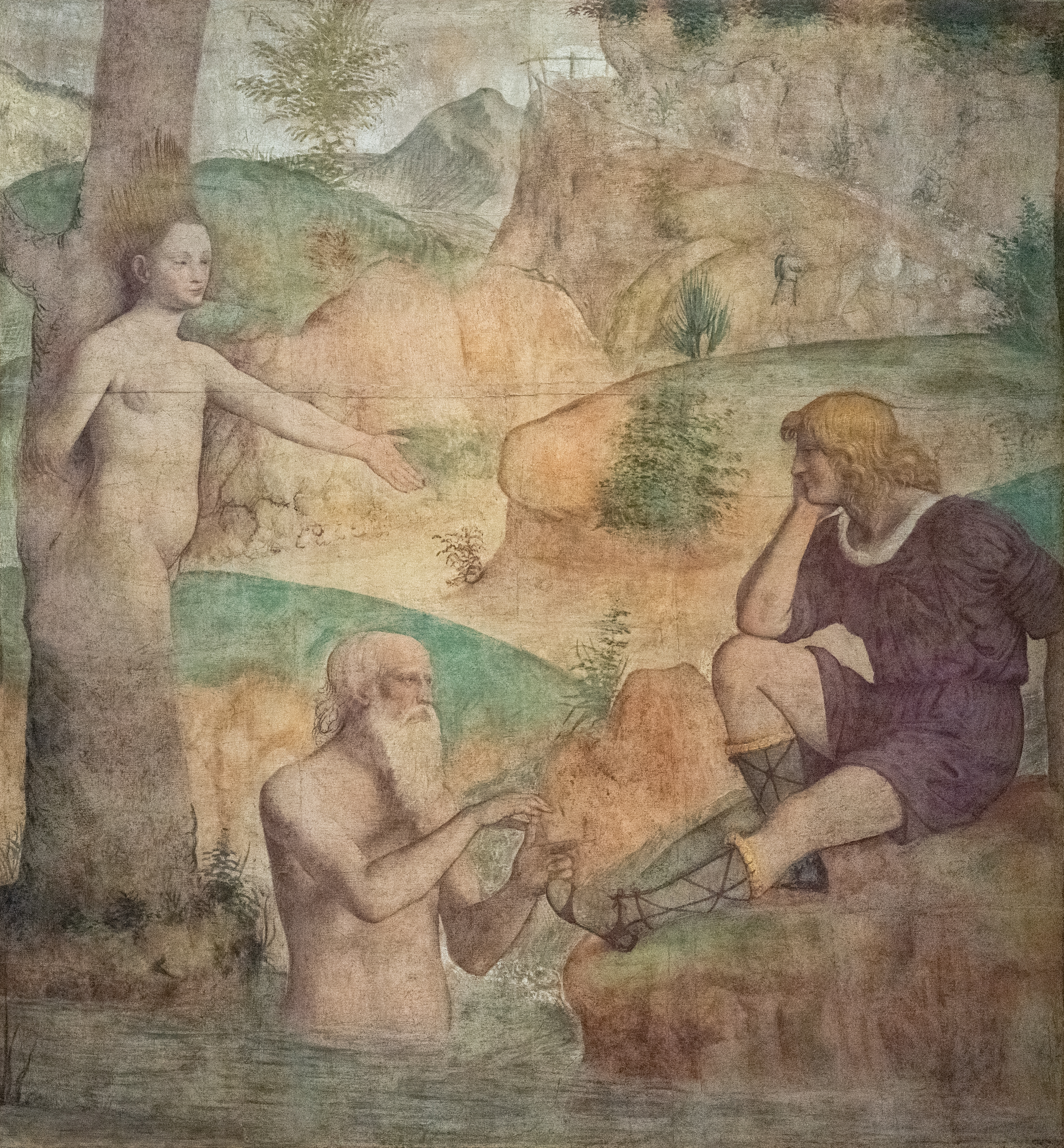
Severe comforted by Driope and Tavaiano

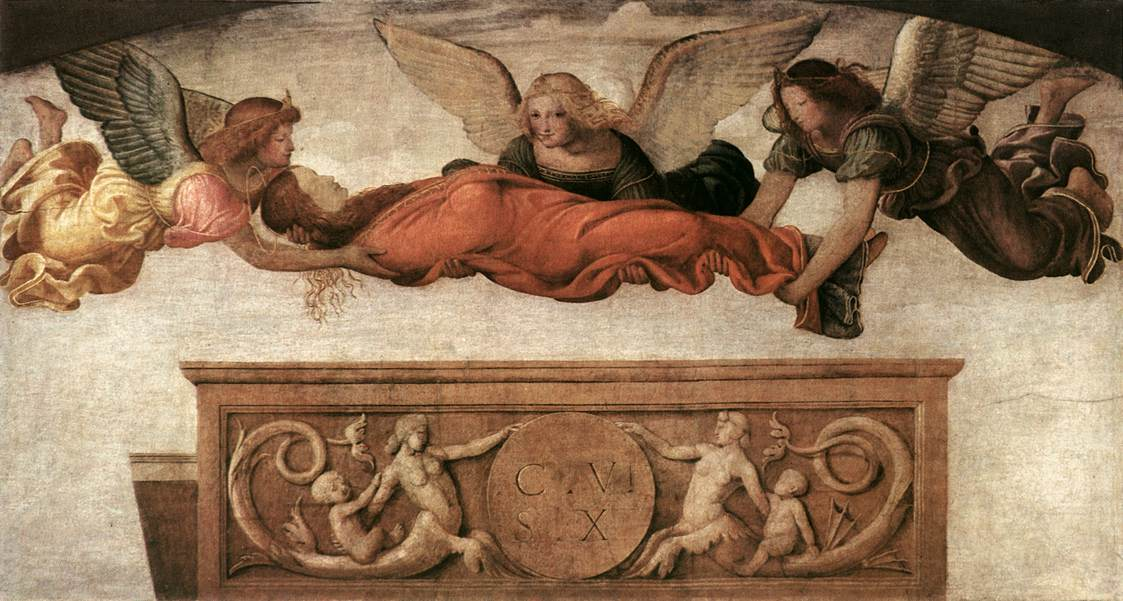
Angels Carrying the Body of St Catherine of Alexandria

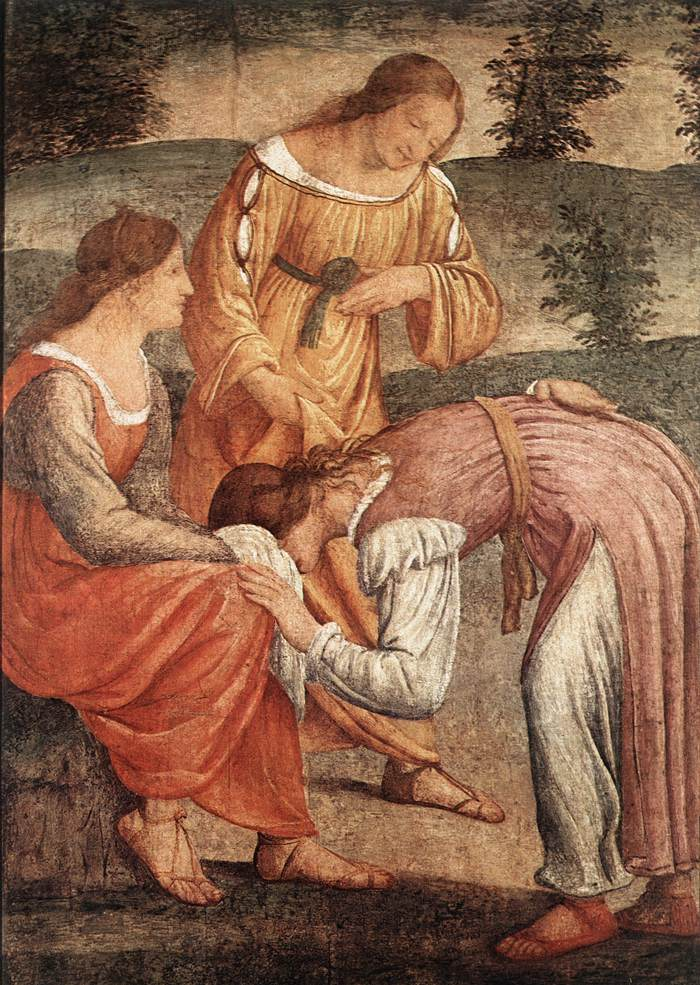
The Game of the Golden Cushion

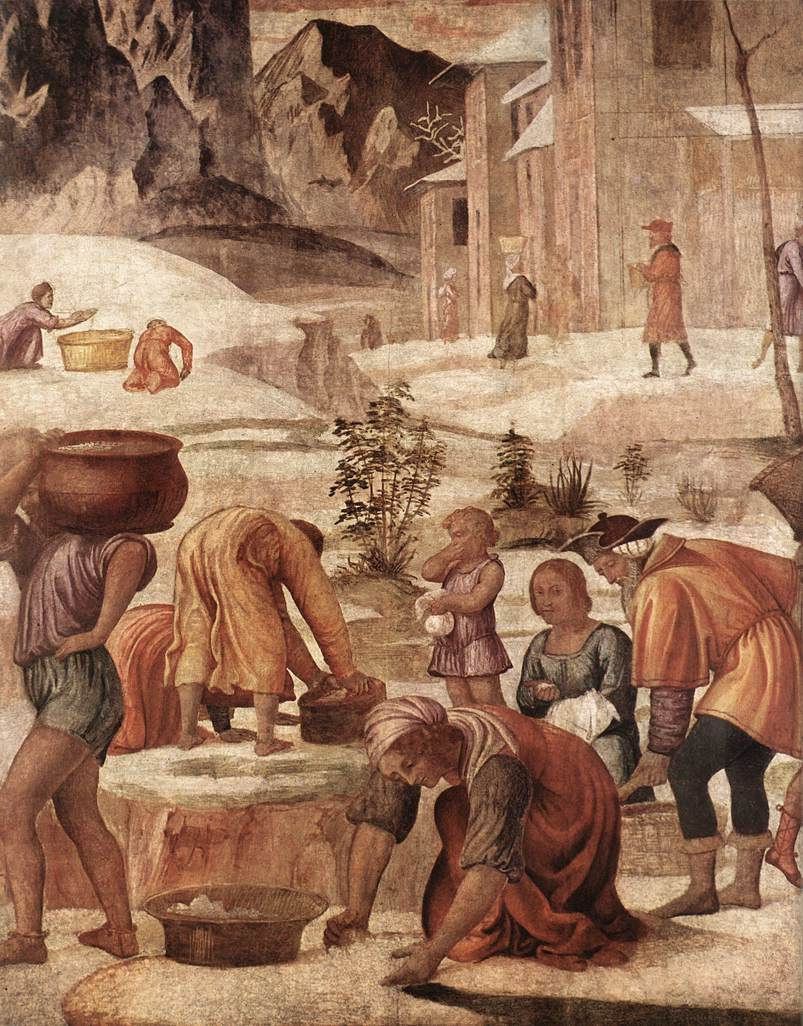
Gathering the Manna

== Known scenes ==
Measurements in cm.

=== Pinacoteca di Brera ===
- Knight, 165x133
- Family of Satyrs Sacrificing to Pan, 176x147
- Scene of Metamorphoses, 167x156
- Celebration of Passover, 117x173
- Death of the Firstborn, 211x169
- Preparations for the Departure of the Jews, 275x170
- The Egyptians' Gifts to the Jews, 149x120
- The Jews' Song of Triumph, 243x143
- Gathering the Manna, 200x145
- Bust of a Girl, 47x37
- Pair of Young Men, 53x61
- The Game of the Golden Cushion, 140x100
- Mythological Scene, with the Birth of Adonis in the Background, 208x193
- Girls Bathing, 135x235
- Three Harvesting Putti, 50x72, 60x65, 60x72
- Angels Carrying the Body of St Catherine of Alexandria, 123x228
- The Egyptian Army Drowned in the Red Sea, 179x168
- The Egyptian Army Submerged in the Red Sea, 130x170
- Vulcan's Forge, 240x163
- Moses Striking the Rock, 122x173
- Moses Praying, 68x50
- God the Father Blessing
- Adoring Angel

=== Wallace Collection ===
- Harvesting Putto, lunette, 49,2x64
- Head of a Woman, 48,4x35,6

=== Musée Condé ===
- Harvesting Putto, lunette fragment, 32x41
- Bust of a Woman, 29x30

=== Private collections ===
- Adoring Angel
