= Christ Among the Doctors (Luini) =

Painting by Bernardino Luini

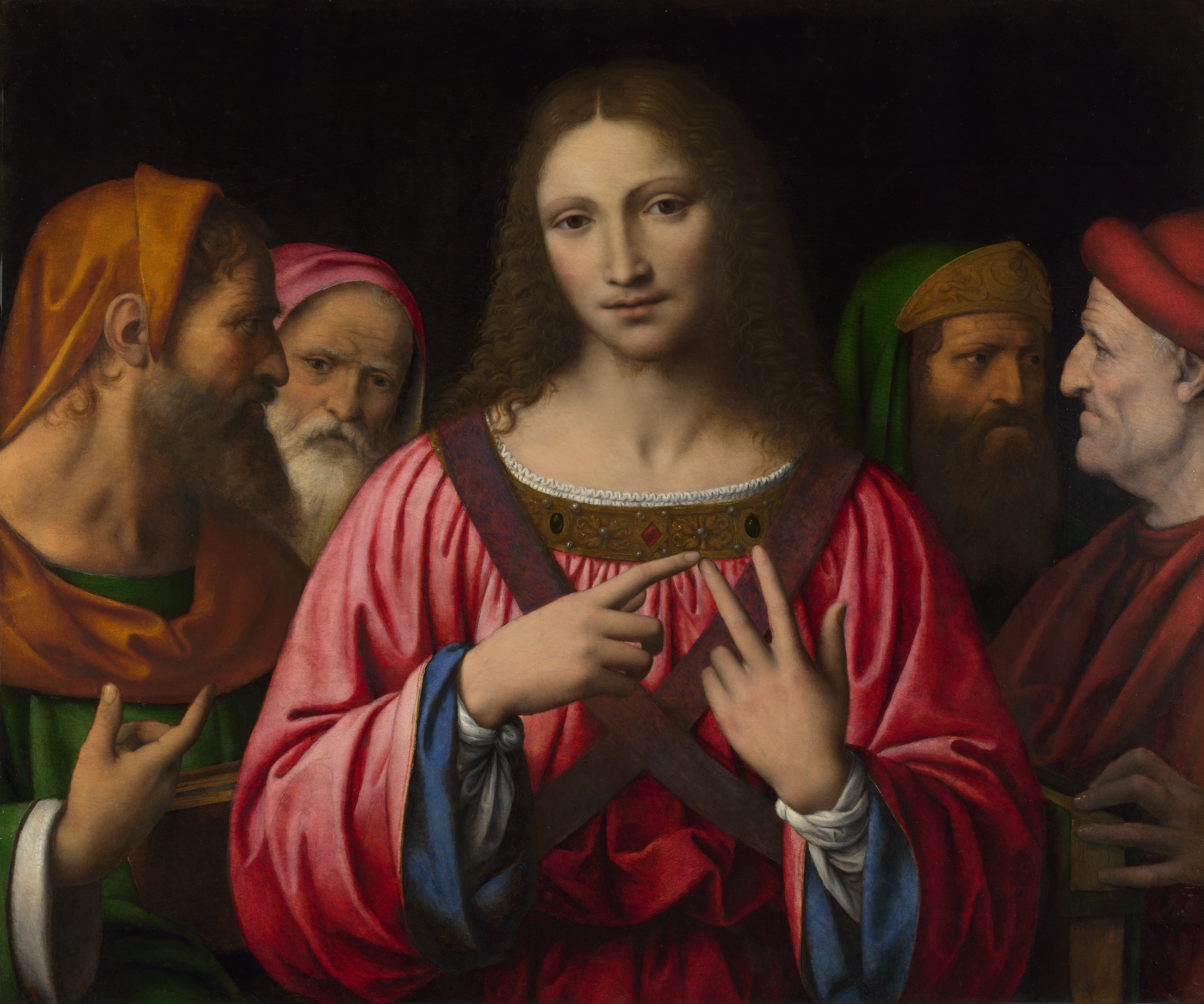
- Artist: Bernardino Luini
- Year: c. 1515–1530
- Medium: Oil on panel
- Dimensions: 72.4 cm × 85.7 cm (28.5 in × 33.7 in)
- Location: National Gallery, London

Christ Among the Doctors is an oil painting on panel of c. 1510–1530 by the Italian Renaissance artist Bernardino Luini in the National Gallery, London, depicting Christ with the doctors of the law. In addition to the prime version in London, copies of varying quality also survive.

== History and description ==
The work depicts a passage in the Gospel of Luke (2:41) in which the twelve-year-old Christ is discovered by his parents in the Temple of Jerusalem, debating the Holy Scriptures with the theologians, whom he astonishes with his wisdom. Dürer's version of the episode led to the subject becoming popular around Venice, and Isabella d'Este requested Leonardo da Vinci to produce a work on the subject. He never completed this work, but probable lost preparatory drawings for it may have inspired Luini and Cima da Conegliano's versions of the scene. In them Christ is seen explaining in the midst of the doctors with lively gesticulations, while with his left hand turned towards the back he raises two fingers, as if to organize his discourse into two fundamental points, and with the right he touches the first finger as if to begin his dissertation.

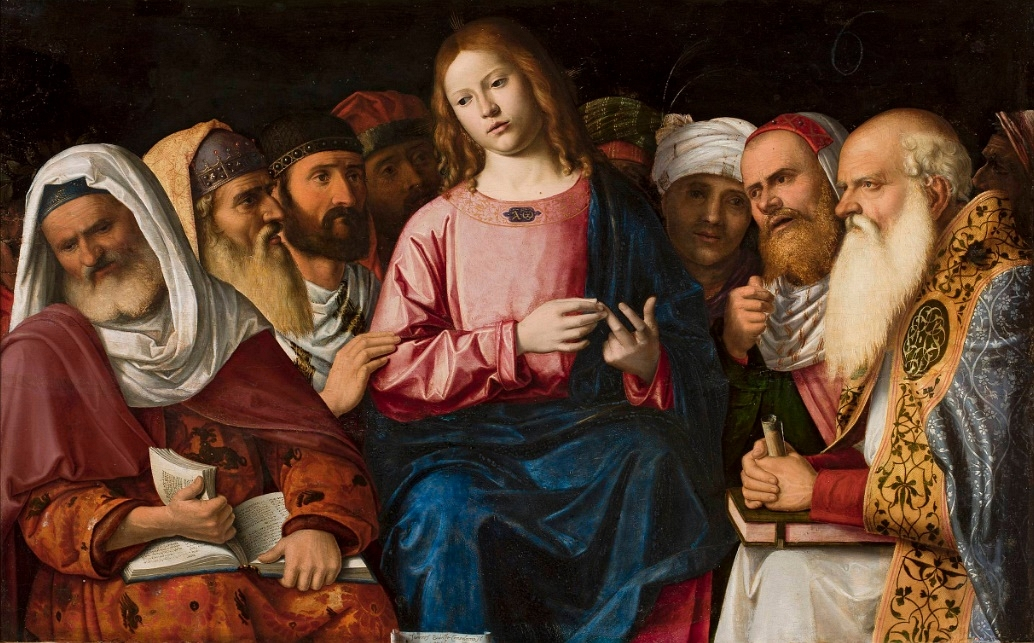
Cima da Conegliano, Christ Among the Doctors (1504), National Museum, Warsaw

Luini's version in particular also shows close proximity to Leonardo in the group of four doctors with faces bordering on caricature, which are derived from a famous series of studies by the master. In fact, it is no coincidence that in the past the work was assigned to Leonardo, also due to the soft chiaroscuro enveloping the figures, which emerge from a dark background. The same physical type of Christ, with a young and ephebic face and long hair, recalls the portraits of young pupils which Leonardo used to insert in his heads of saints. Compared to the master, however, Luini accentuated the vivacity of the colours, showing the influence of the Venetian school, with the bright pink robe of Christ and those of the doctors, in which echoes can also be caught of the bearded saints of Giovanni Bellini. The crossing of gazes between the doctors is rich, but it lacks a precise centre of gravity, thus communicating their bewilderment before the knowledge of Christ, who appears self-confident and directs his gaze towards the viewer.
