= Bernardino Luini =

Italian painter (c. 1480/82–1532)

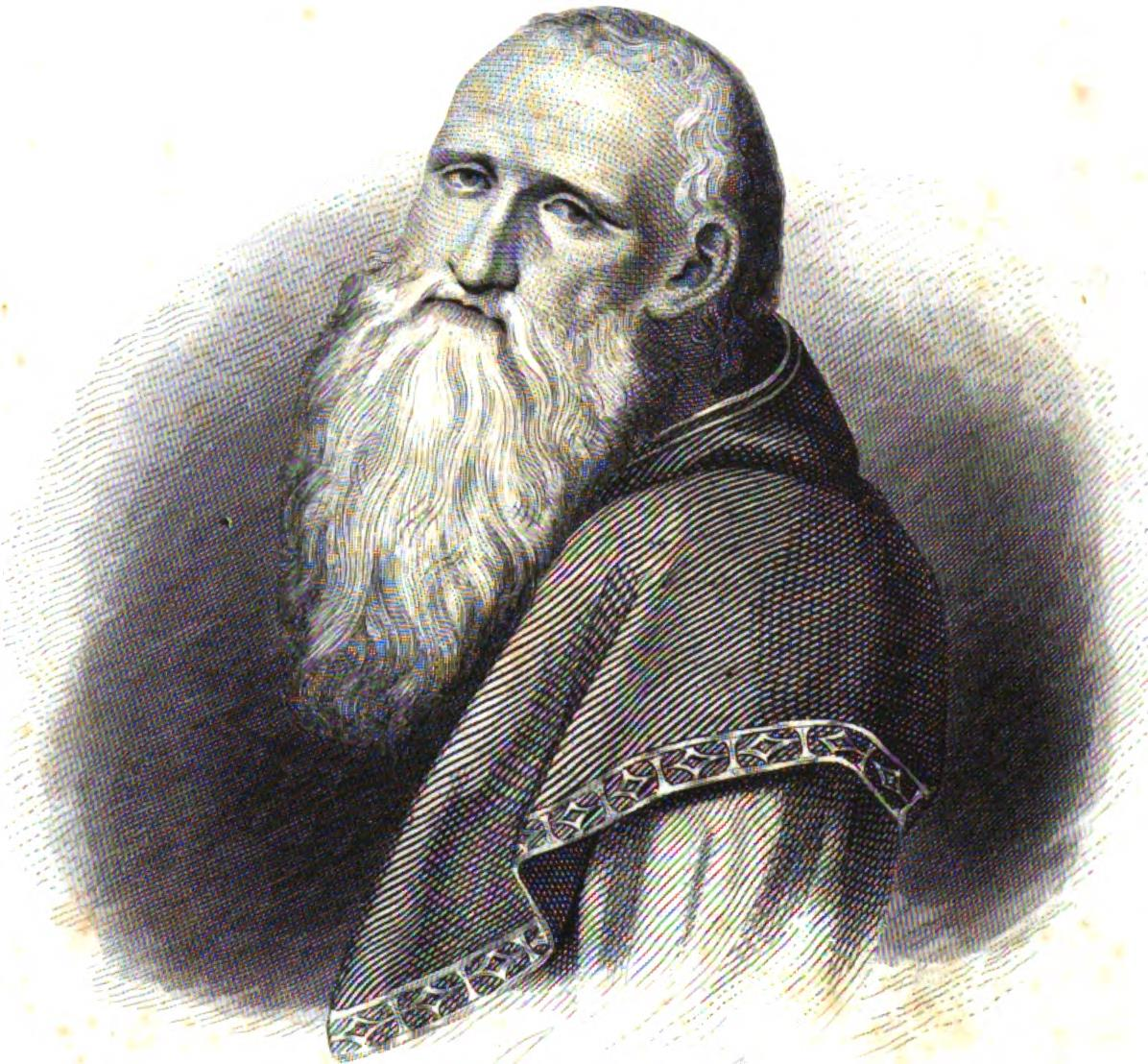
- Luini in a 1851 illustration
- Born: c. 1480–1482; Runo, Dumenza
- Died: June 1532; Milan
- Movement: Italian Renaissance

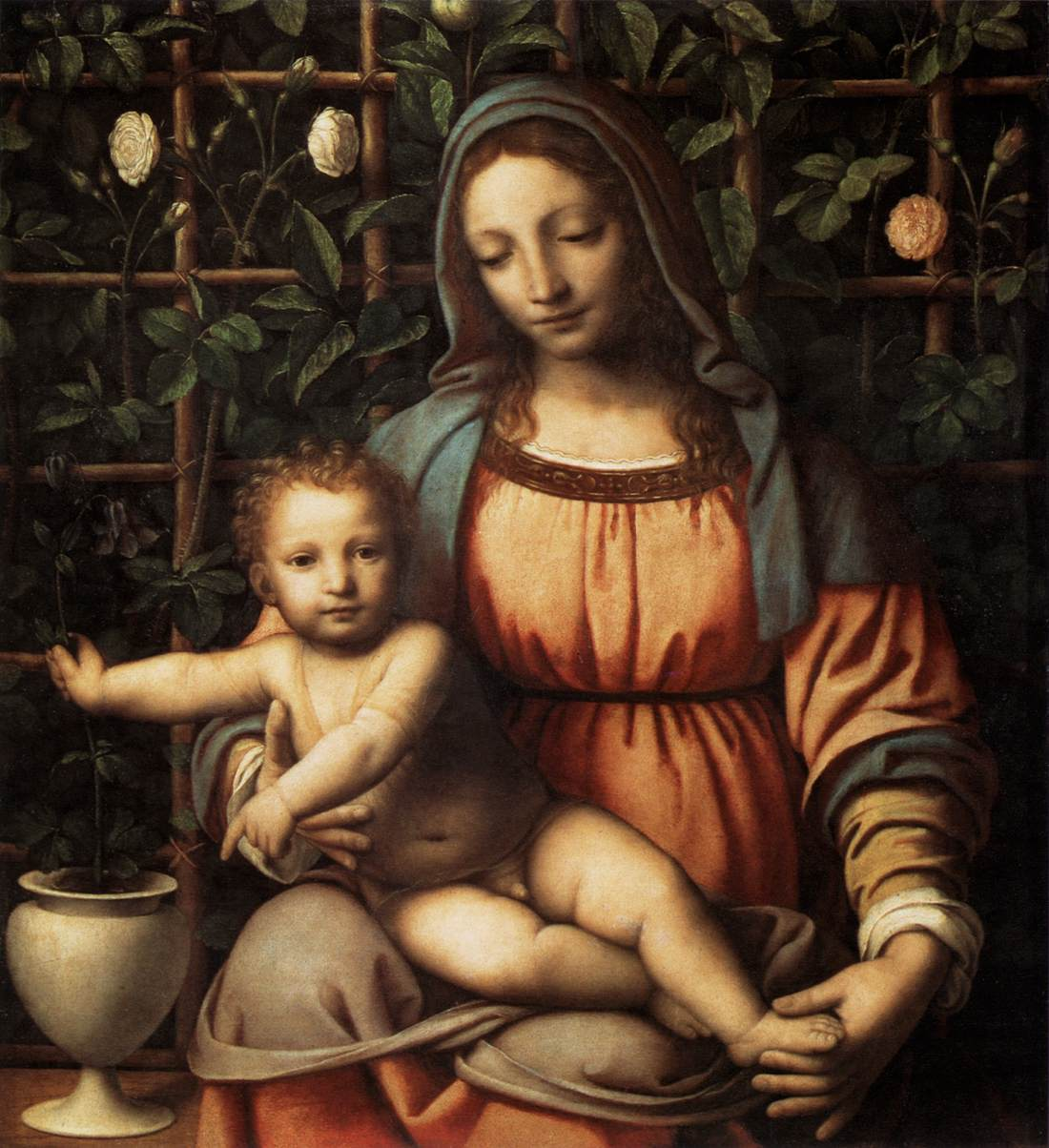
Madonna del Roseto (Pinacoteca di Brera)

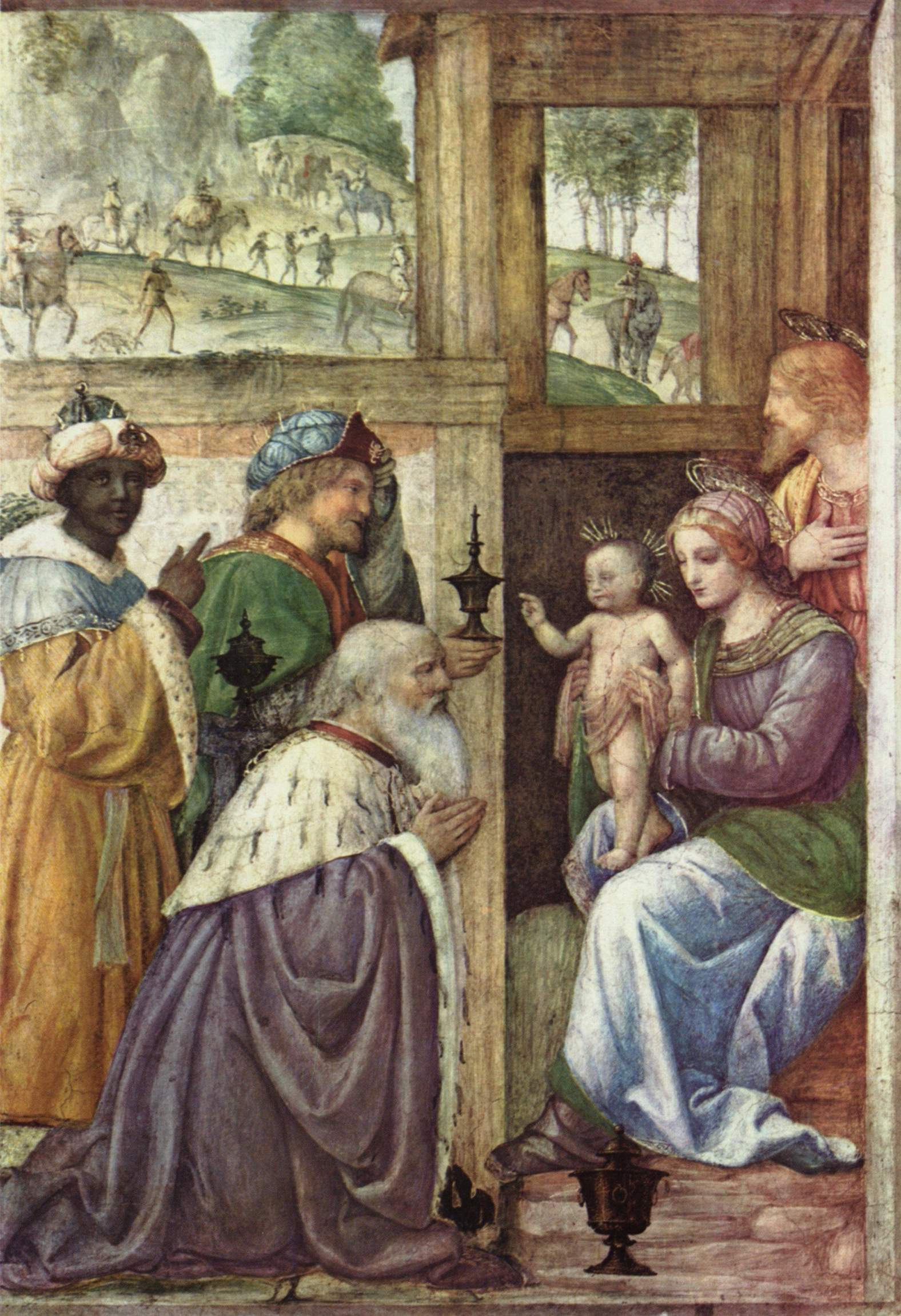
Adoration of the Magi, detached fresco, 1520–25 (Musée du Louvre)

Portrait of a Lady (1515; National Gallery of Art, Washington, D.C.)

Bernardino Luini (c. 1480/82 – June 1532) was a north Italian painter from Leonardo's circle during the High Renaissance. Both Luini and Giovanni Antonio Boltraffio were said to have worked with Leonardo directly; he was described as having taken "as much from Leonardo as his native roots enabled him to comprehend". Consequently, many of his works were attributed to Leonardo. He was known especially for his graceful female figures with elongated eyes, called Luinesque by Vladimir Nabokov.

== Biography ==
Luini was born as Bernardino de Scapis in Runo, a frazione of Dumenza, near Lake Maggiore. Details of his life are scant.

In 1500 he moved to Milan with his father. According to Lomazzo, he trained under Giovan Stefano Scotto, although for others he was a pupil of Ambrogio Bergognone. In 1504-1507 he was probably in Treviso, as attested by a Madonna with Child signed Bernardinus Mediolanensis faciebat which is however of disputed attribution. His first fresco works are an Adoration of the Magi in San Pietro of Luino (c. 1505) and the attributed fresco in the presbytery of Monza Cathedral with St. Gerard of the Painters.

Luini returned to Milan in 1509, receiving a commission for a polyptych from which today only St. Anthony of Padua in the Museo Poldi Pezzoli, influenced by Bernardino Zenale's Cantù Polyptych remains. In the 1510s he painted frescoes in the Oratory of Santa Maria Nuova in Pilastrello, a Lamentation of the dead Christ in Santa Maria della Passione, a Madonna della Buonanotte in the Abbey of Chiaravalle, frescoes in San Giorgio di Palazzo (1516) and in the Certosa di Pavia, and others.

From 1509 to 1514 Luini completed the frescoes for the Villa Pelucca in Sesto San Giovanni (now in the Pinacoteca di Brera, Milan). One of his best-known works was commissioned by Girolamo Rabia, for whom he also painted mythological scenes in the Palazzo Rabia (now in the Berlin Gemäldegalerie and the National Gallery of Art, Washington, D.C.).

In 1521, he travelled to Rome, where he was influenced by Raphael's style. This is evident in Luini's subsequent frescoes in the Villa La Pelucca executed between 1520 and 1523, as well as in other works now at the Brera. In 1523, Luini painted a polyptych depicting the Enthroned Madonna and Child surrounded by Angels with Musical Instruments, and surmounted by God the Father, found in the Basilica of San Magno, Legnano.

Around 1525, he completed a series of frescoes on the life of the Virgin and Christ for the sanctuary of Santa Maria dei Miracoli in Saronno; the fresco in the counterfaçade of Sant'Abbondio in Como was painted the same year. According to legend, he instigated the discovery of amaretto while at Saronno. Other works from his middle period include a Holy Family in the Museo del Prado, two Salome in the Museum of Fine Arts in Boston and the Uffizi and a Portrait of a Lady in the National Gallery of Art. A Virgin with Child and Saints from 1526 is in the Lee Fareham collection of Richmond.

In 1529, Luini completed one of his masterworks, the grand Passion and Crucifixion fresco at Santa Maria degli Angeli in Lugano, paired with other works in the same church. In 1531 he returned to the Saronno sanctuary to complete other frescoes. Later in his career, Luini was increasingly influenced by Leonardo da Vinci, as shown by the St. Anne in the Pinacoteca Ambrosiana and the St. Catherine in the Hermitage.

He died in Milan. His son Aurelio was also an accomplished painter.

At least one prominent art scholar believes that the Salvator Mundi was not painted by Leonardo but mostly by assistants such as Luini; art historian Matthew Landrus maintained that the master was responsible for only about five to 20% of the work and that Luini was the "primary painter".

== Work ==
(examples)

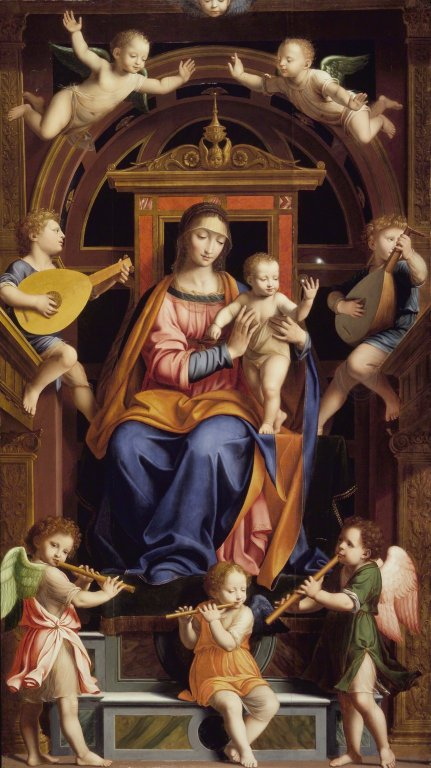
Workshop of Bernardino Luini: Madonna and Child Enthroned with Angels, Brooklyn Museum

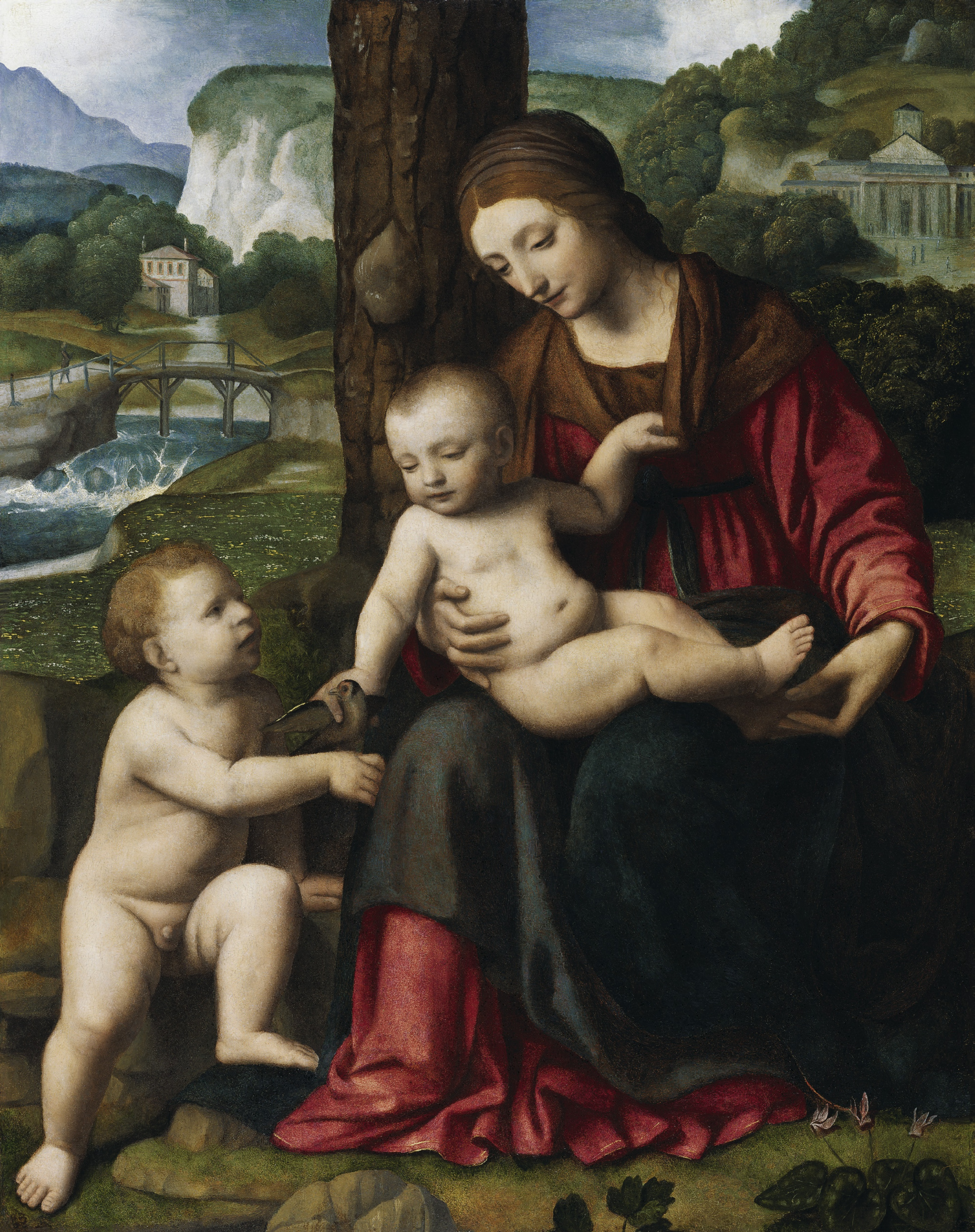
Madonna col bambino e san Giovannino, Lichtenstein Museum

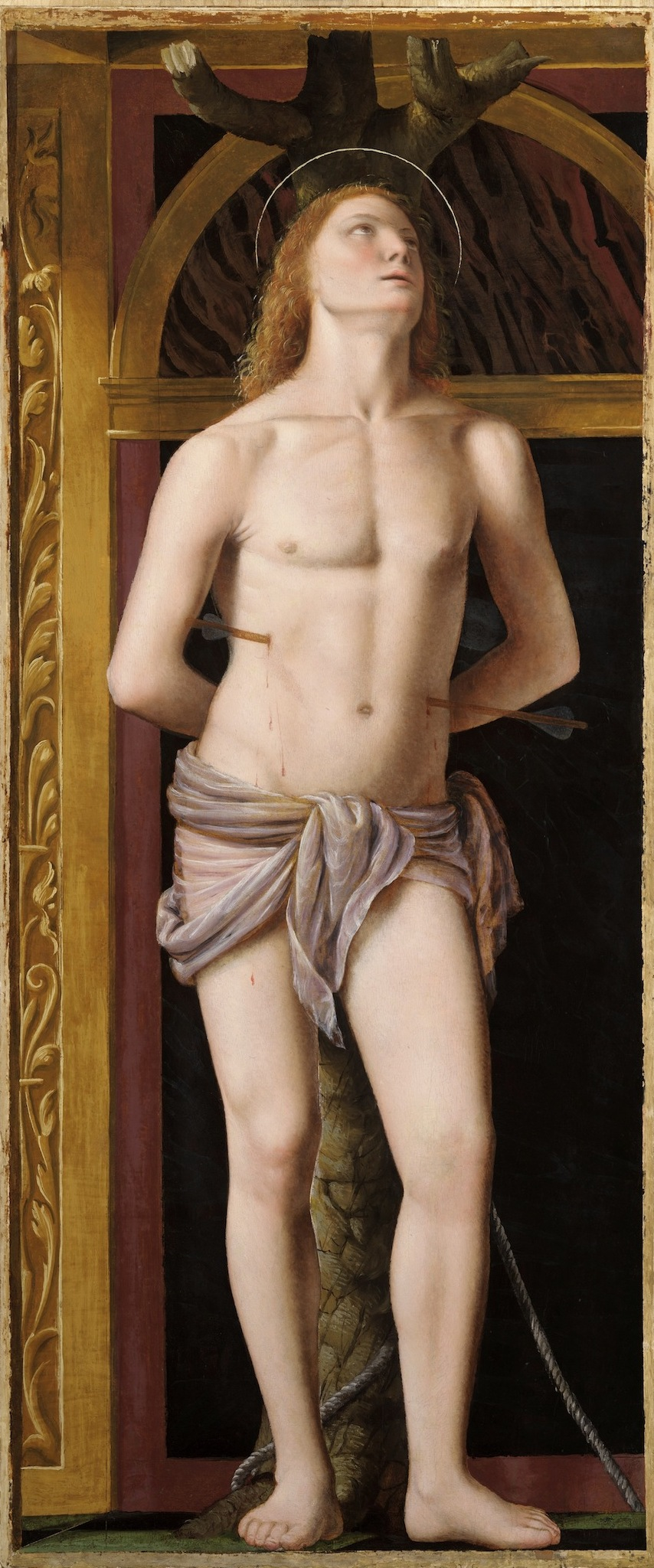
San Sebastiano, the Borromeo collection at Isola Bella

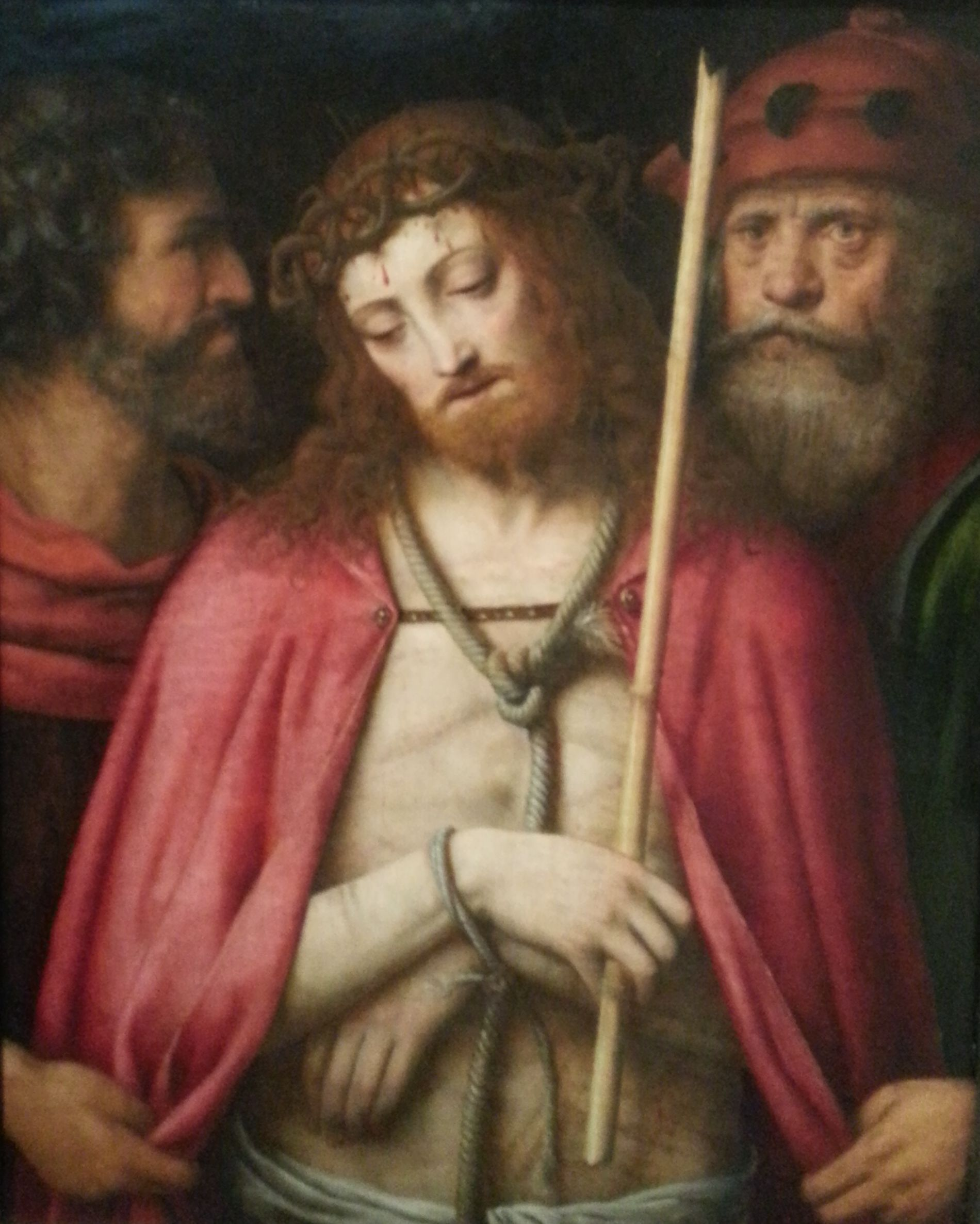
Ecce Homo, c.1500–1530, Wallraf-Richartz Museum, Cologne

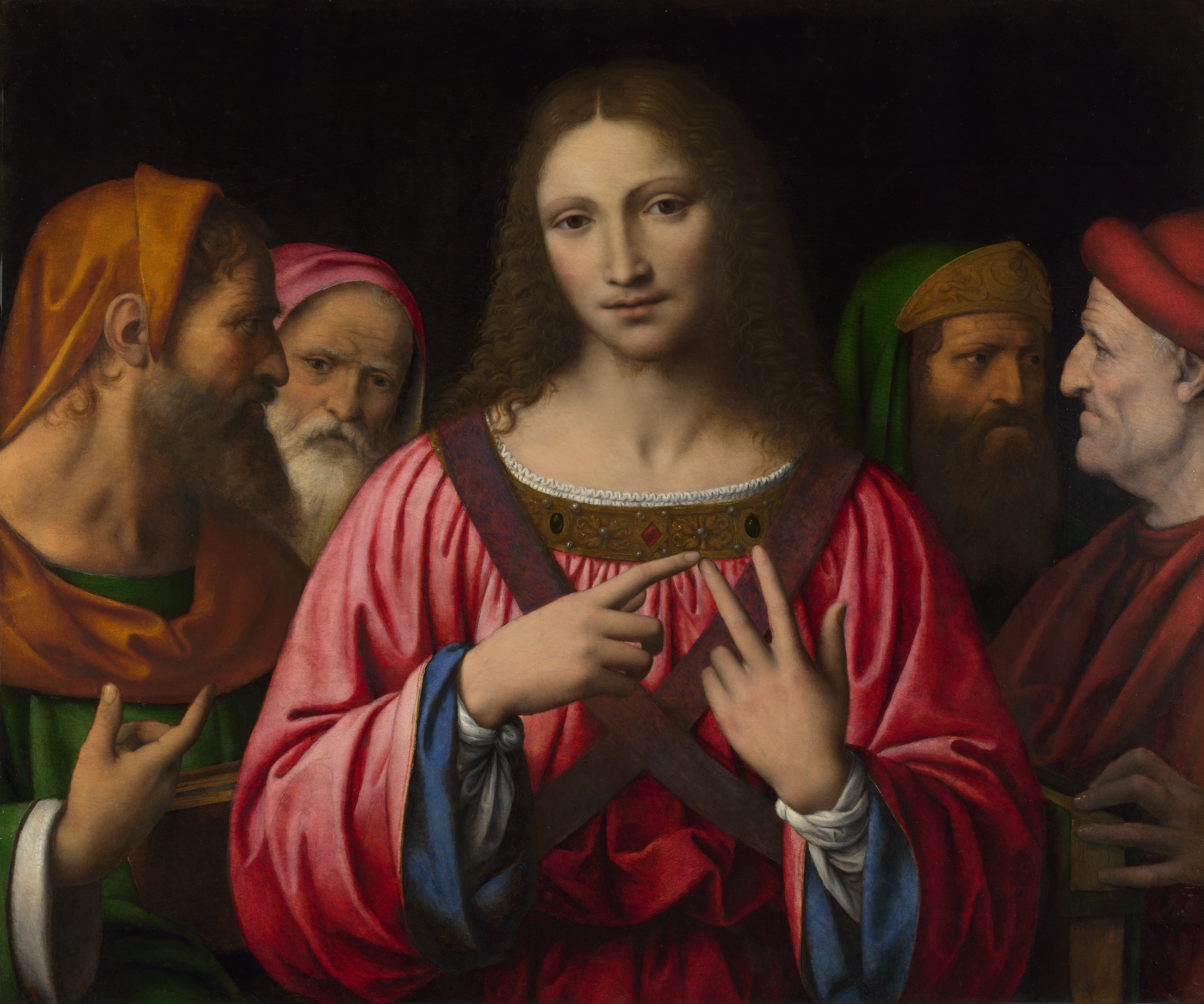
Christ among Doctors, c. 1515–1530, National Gallery, London

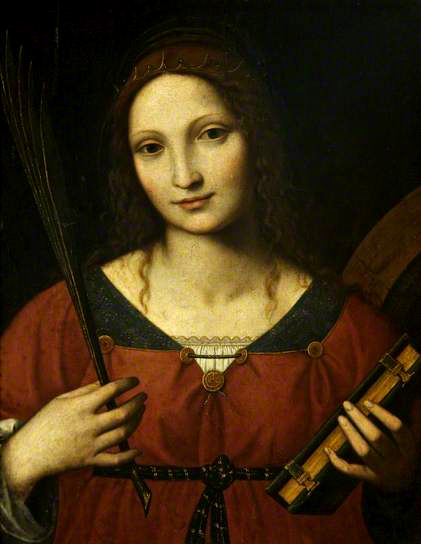
Saint Catherine. National Art Museum of Azerbaijan, Baku

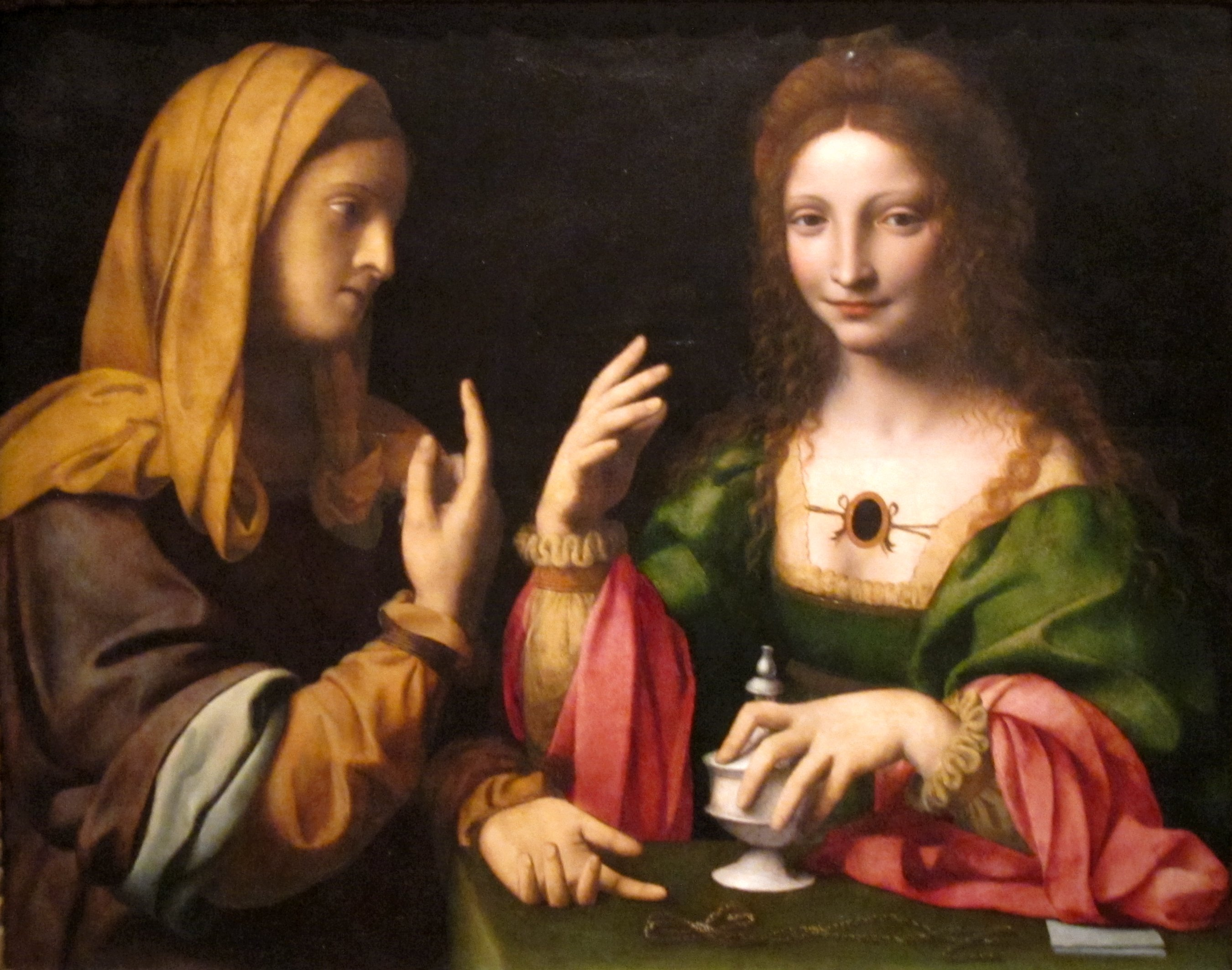
Conversion of the Magdalene or Allegory of Modesty and Vanity by Bernardino Luini, c. 1520

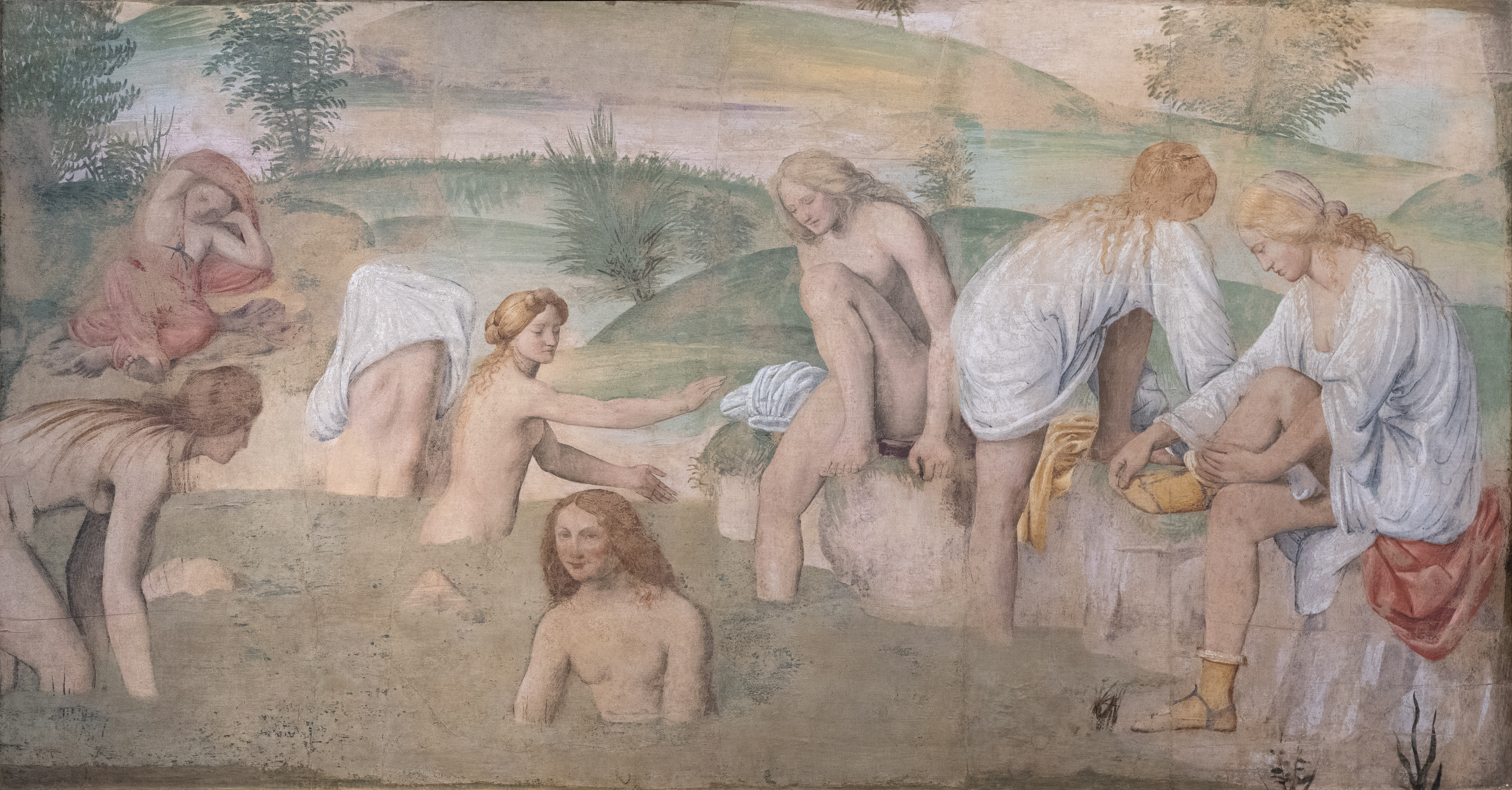
Villa La Pelucca frescoes, 1520–1523 cycle

== Selected works ==
- Madonna with Sts Augustine and Margaret, Musée Jacquemart-André, Paris. Signed "Bernardino Milasnese", and dated 1507. "An index of the solidity of Luini's training in a veristic, rigid Quattrocento style" (Freedberg 1993:390), before the transforming, but superficial influence of Leonardo's style.
- Virgin, Child, and St. John (c. 1510), National Gallery, London. Another version in Fogg Art Museum, Boston.
- Madonna Enthroned, abbey of Chiaravalle (c. 1512)
- Christ among the Doctors (c. 1515-30), National Gallery, London
- Frescoes from the Cappella di S. Giuseppe, S. Maria della Pace, (1518–20) Detached, in the Brera Gallery.
- St. Catherine, National Gallery, London. (Another version in the Hermitage, St. Petersburg)
- Salome, Ball State Museum, Indiana
- Mary and Martha, oil on wood, private collection of Varina Howell Davis and on display at Beauvoir in Biloxi, Mississippi
- Conversion of Mary Magdalen, San Diego
- Fresco cycles for city and country houses of the Rabia family (1520–25) Now in the Brera, at Berlin, in Washington (National Gallery of Art Procris and Cephalus from Casa Rabia, Milan) and elsewhere. Several panel paintings also at the National Gallery, Washington DC.
- Madonna and Child with St. John, Liechtenstein Collection, Vienna.
- Saint Ambrose (c. 1520-22), Museum of the Certosa di Pavia.
- Saint Martin (c. 1520-22), Museum of the Certosa di Pavia.
- Female portrait (1521-23), Pavia Civic Museums.
- Frescoes of the Life of Christ and the Life of the Virgin. (1525) S. Maria dei Miracoli, Saronno.
- Portrait of a Lady (c. 1525) National Gallery of Art, Washington.
- Adoration of the Magi, detached fresco, 1520-25 (Musée du Louvre) Alluded to by Marcel Proust
- Holy Family with Saints Anne and John the Baptist
- Ham Mocking Noah, Brera Gallery
- Flora (c. 1515), Sudeley Castle, Gloucestershire. A part of the Morrison Collection, that was put together by the Georgian businessman James Morrison of Basildon Park.
- "Holy Family with the Infant St John", Museo del Prado, Madrid. Panel, 100 x 84 cm. Compare with da Vinci's "Madonna/Virgin of the Rocks" at Louvre and National Gallery London

== See also ==
- Salome with the Head of John the Baptist (Luini)

== Sources ==
- Freedberg, Sydney J. (1993). Pelican History of Art (ed.). Painting in Italy, 1500-1600. Penguin Books. pp. 390–391.
- Lavin, Irving (1954). Journal of the Warburg and Courtauld Institutes (ed.). Cephalus and Procris: Transformations of an Ovidian Myth. Vol. XVII. pp. 260–87, 366–72.
