= San Giovanni Battista Decollato, Montemurlo =

Roman Catholic rural parish church in Tuscany, Italy

Coordinates: 43.928616°N 11.045382°E

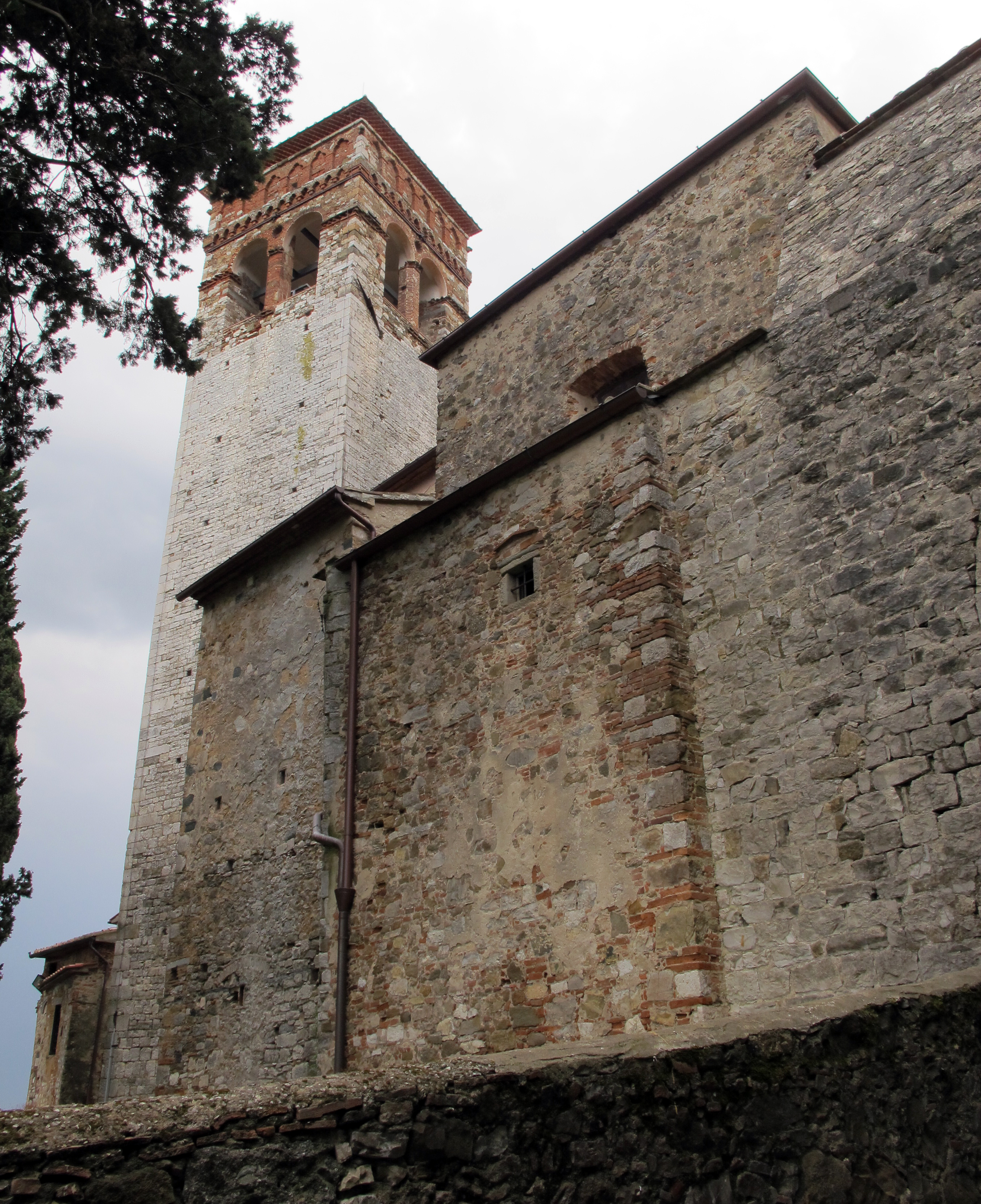

San Giovanni Battista Decollato (St John the Baptist Beheaded) is a renaissance-style, Roman Catholic rural parish church located in the Borgo della Rocca of town of Montemurlo, province of Prato, region of Tuscany, Italy.

== History ==
The pieve church has an unfinished brick facade with a 15th-century portico. A single nave with lateral altars is now lit by 18th-century windows. The church houses an altarpiece depicting the Madonna and Child with Saints (1522) by Francesco Granacci; another Madonna and Saints (1590) by Giovanni Stradano; a Virgin of the Rosary and Saints (1609) by Matteo Rosselli, and a canvas by Giacinto Fabbroni. The presbytery has a venerated silver crucifix from the 14th century. The Story of the Crucifix (circa 1593) was depicted in frescoes by Giovanni da Prato on the counterfacade above the portal. The adjacent oratory once housed a gonfalone painted by Stradano.
