= Salome with the Head of John the Baptist (Luini) =

Painting by Bernardino Luini

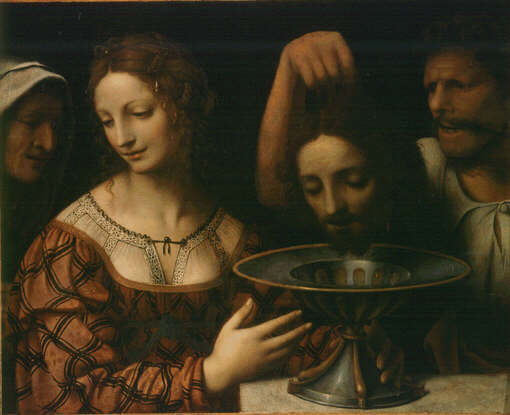
Salome with the Head of John the Baptist (c. 1527) by Bernardino Luini

Salome with the Head of John the Baptist is a c. 1527 oil-on-panel painting by Bernardino Luini. It was in the Imperial Gallery, in Vienna, until 1773, when it was swapped for another work and arrived in Florence, where it now hangs in the Uffizi Gallery. Six autograph variants of the work are also now in the Kunsthistorisches Museum, the Louvre, the Boston Museum of Fine Arts, the Prado Museum and Prince Borromeo's collection in Isola Bella.

== History ==
At the time of its arrival in Florence it was attributed to Leonardo da Vinci, but was reattributed to Luini by Gouthiez based on an 1890 inventory - Beltrami dated it to c. 1527-1530, late in Luini's life. Art historians argue that Salome's face was based on Leonardo's La Scapigliata.

== Description and analysis ==
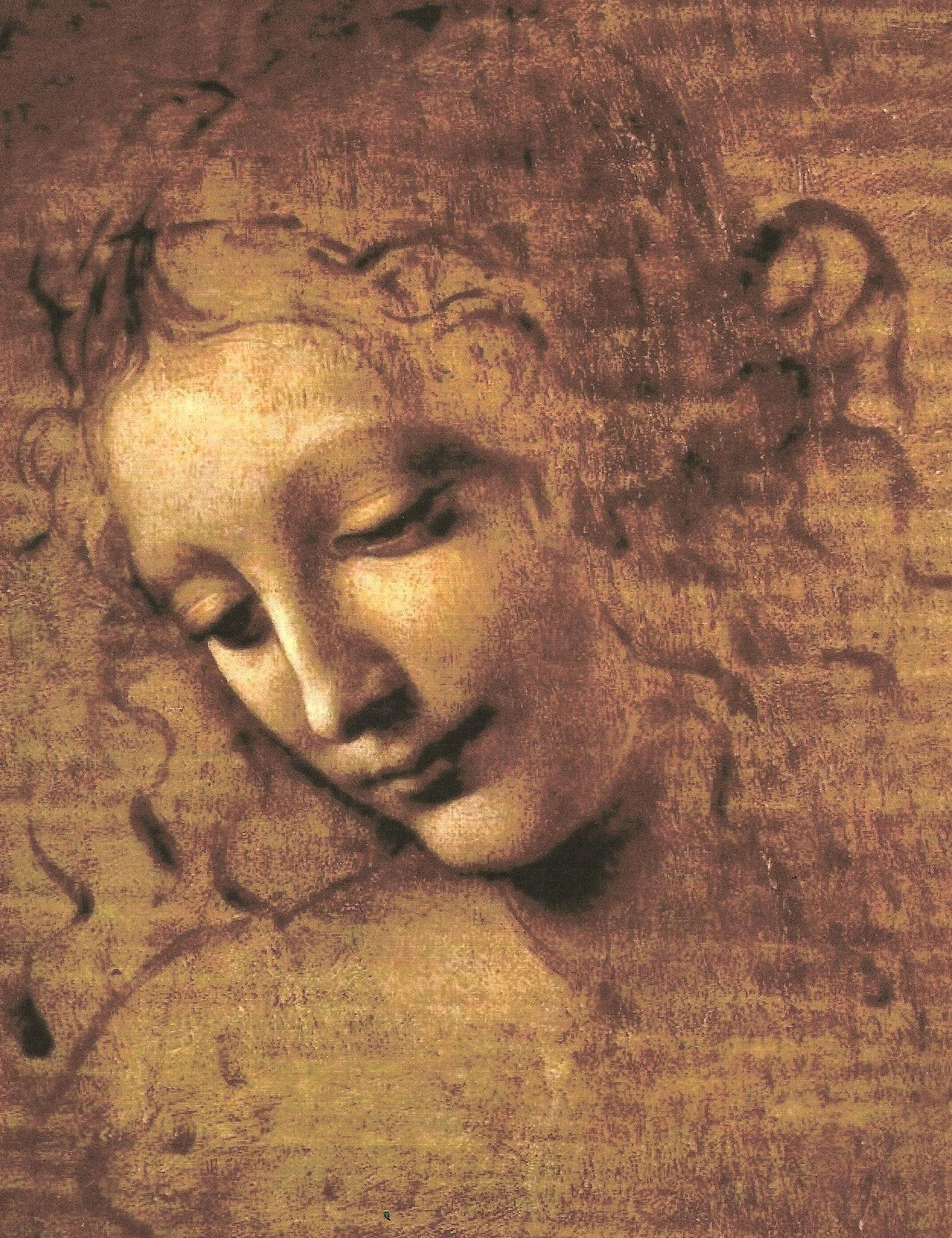
Leonardo da Vinci, La Scapigliata, c. 1508

The painting depicts an executioner, who is propping the severed head of John the Baptist into a footed stand resting on a ledge and held by Salome (or possibly Herodias). On the left, an old woman with a veiled head, probably a maid, witnesses the scene. The face of the executioner is described with almost caricatural features, which enhance his ugliness and wickedness, in contrast with the delicate features of the lifeless face of the Baptist. Particular attention is paid to the sumptuous dress of Salome, characteristic of the fashion of the early 16th century, as well to her elaborate braided hair. Leonardo's influence is particularly evident in the girl's face.
