= The Head of Saint John the Baptist Presented to Salome =

Painting by Peter Paul Rubens

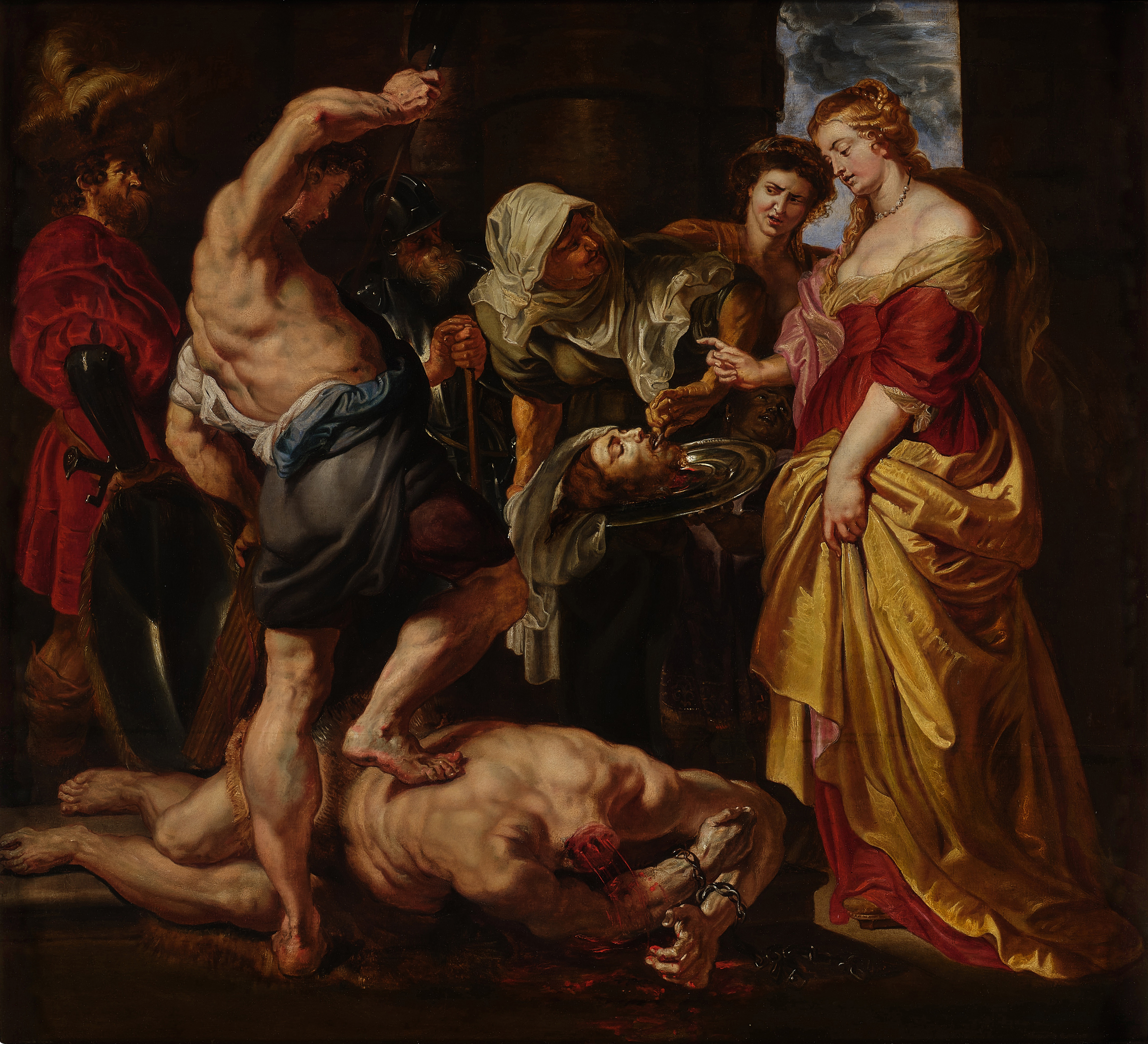
- Artist: Peter Paul Rubens
- Year: 1609 (c.)
- Type: oil on panel
- Dimensions: 94 cm × 101.8 cm (37 in × 40 in)
- Location: Private collection

The Head of Saint John the Baptist presented to Salome is a circa 1609 oil on panel painting by the Flemish artist Peter Paul Rubens (1577–1640) executed shortly after his return to Antwerp after an eight year stay in Italy.

The painting which had been lost or misattributed for over 200 years was rediscovered in 1987 and in 1998 sold for $5.5 million US. The work then became part of the Fisch-Davidson collection of Baroque paintings and in turn was sold in February 2023 during Sotheby's Old Masters sale for $26.9 million the third highest ever price for a work by Rubens.

The work depicts the head of John the Baptist being presented to Salome just moments after it has been severed from the biblical figure's body.
