= The Virgin and Child with Saint Anne and Saint John the Baptist =

Cartoon by Leonardo da Vinci

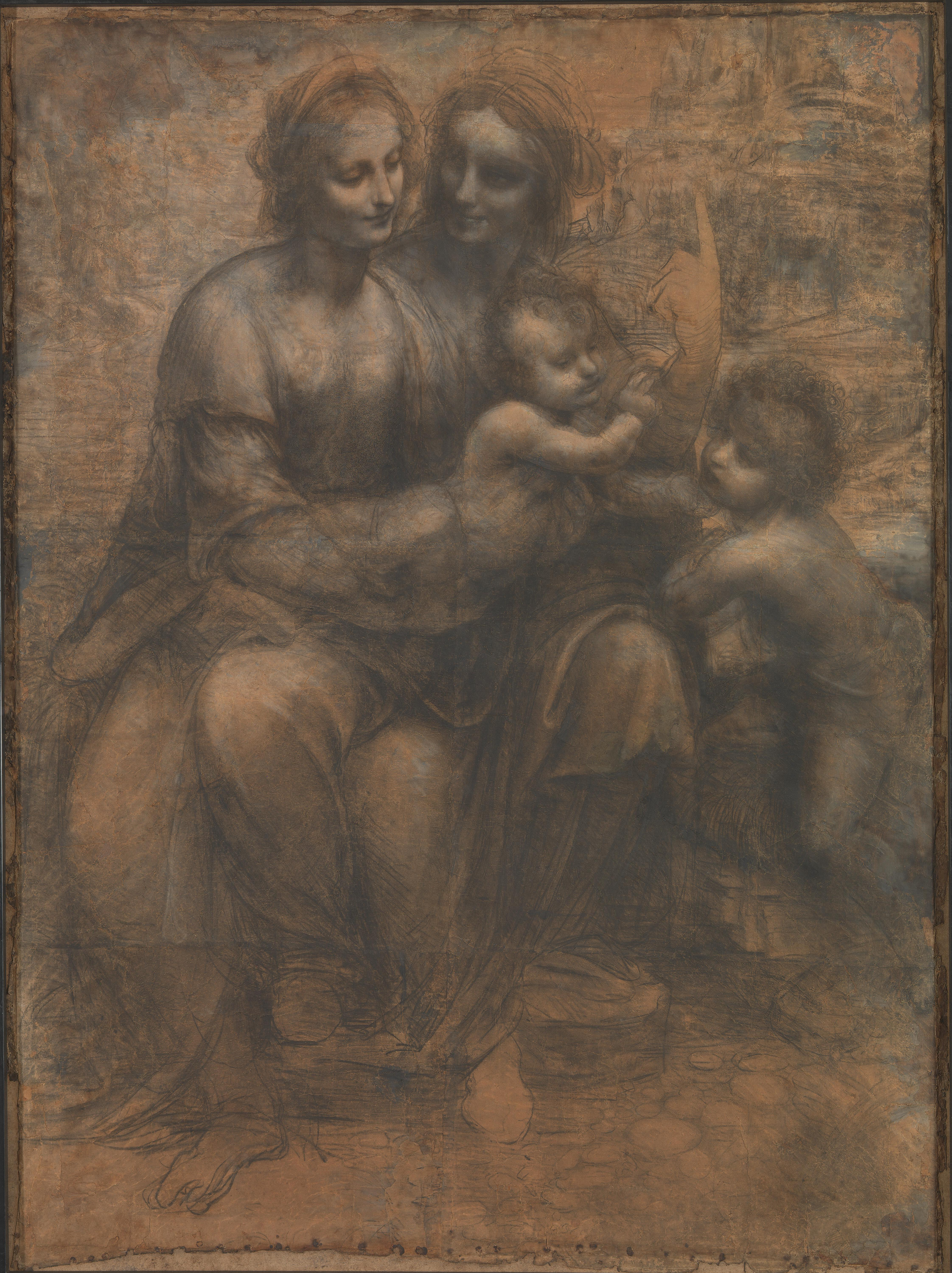
- Artist: Leonardo da Vinci
- Year: c. 1499–1500 or c. 1506–1508
- Medium: charcoal, black and white chalk on tinted paper mounted on canvas
- Dimensions: 141.5 cm × 104.6 cm (55.7 in × 41.2 in)
- Location: National Gallery, London

The Virgin and Child with Saint Anne and Saint John the Baptist, sometimes called the Burlington House Cartoon, is a drawing by Leonardo da Vinci. The drawing is in charcoal and black and white chalk, on eight sheets of paper that are glued together. Because of its large size and format the drawing is presumed to be a cartoon for a painting. No painting by Leonardo exists that is based directly on this cartoon, although the drawing may have been in preparation for a now lost or unexecuted painting commissioned by Louis XII. The drawing is the only extant larger-scale drawing by the artist.

The drawing depicts the Virgin Mary seated on the thigh of her mother, Saint Anne, while holding the Christ Child as Christ's young cousin, John the Baptist, stands to the right. It currently hangs in the National Gallery in London.

It was executed either around 1499–1500, at the end of the artist's first Milanese period, or around 1506–1508, when he was travelling back and forth between Florence and Milan. The majority of scholars favour the latter date, although the National Gallery and others prefer the former.

== Subject ==
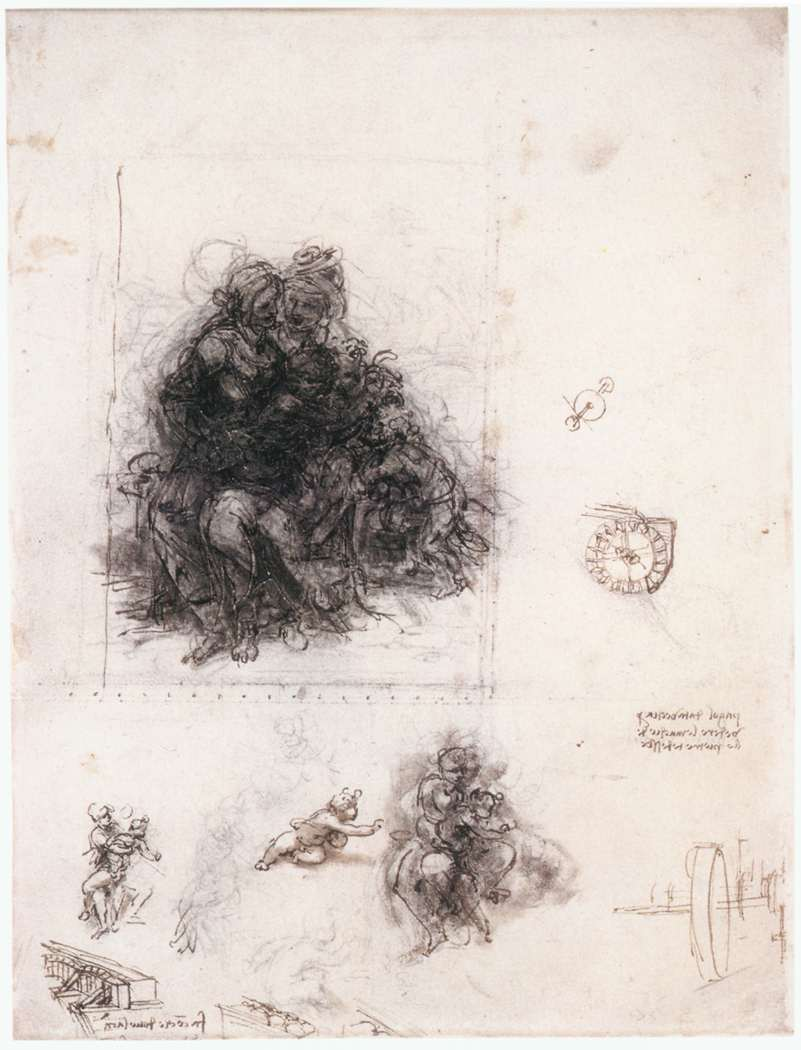
Preparatory drawing in the British Museum contains hydraulic engineering images that may be an aid in dating the work

The subject of the cartoon is a combination of two themes popular in Florentine painting of the fifteenth century: The Virgin and Child with John the Baptist and Virgin and Child with Saint Anne.

The drawing is notable for its complex composition, demonstrating the alternation in the positioning of figures that is first apparent in Leonardo's paintings in the Benois Madonna. The knees of the two women point in different directions, with Mary's knees turning out of the painting to the left, while her body turns sharply to the right, creating a sinuous movement. The knees and the feet of the figures establish a strong up-and-down rhythm at a point in the composition where a firm foundation comprising firmly planted feet, widely spread knees, and a broad spread of enclosing garment would normally be found. While the lower halves of their bodies turn away, the faces of the two women turn toward each other, mirroring each other's features. The delineation between the upper bodies has lost clarity, suggesting that the heads are part of the same body.

The twisting movement of the Virgin is echoed in the Christ Child, whose body, held almost horizontal by his mother, rotates axially, with the lower body turned upward and the upper body turned downward. This turning posture is first indicated in paintings by Leonardo in the Adoration of the Magi and is explored in a number of drawings, in particular the various studies of the Virgin and Child with a cat that are in the British Museum.

The juxtaposition of two sets of heads is an important compositional element. The angle, lighting, and gaze of the Christ Child reproduces that of his mother, while John the Baptist reproduces these same elements in the face of Saint Anne. The lighting indicates that there are two protagonists, and two supporting cast in the scene that the viewer is witnessing. There is a subtle interplay between the gazes of the four figures. Saint Anne smiles adoringly at her daughter Mary, perhaps indicating not only maternal pride but also the veneration due to the one who "all generations will call...blessed". Mary's eyes are fixed on the Christ Child who raises his hand in a gesture of benediction over the cousin who thirty years later would carry out his appointed task of baptising Christ. Although the older of the two children, John the Baptist humbly accepts the blessing, as one who would later say of his cousin "I am not worthy even to unloose his sandals". Saint Anne's hand, her index finger pointing toward Heaven, is positioned near the heads of the children, perhaps to indicate the original source of the blessing. This enigmatic gesture is regarded as quintessentially Leonardesque, occurring in The Last Supper and Saint John the Baptist.

Cartoons of this sort were usually transferred to a board for painting by pricking or incising the outline. In the Virgin and Child with Saint Anne and Saint John the Baptist there is no evidence of that, suggesting that the drawing was kept as a work of art in its own right. Leonardo does not appear to have based a painting directly on this drawing. The composition differs from Leonardo's only other surviving treatment of the subject, The Virgin and Child with Saint Anne in the Louvre, in which the figure of the Baptist is not present.

=== Works by others derived from the drawing ===
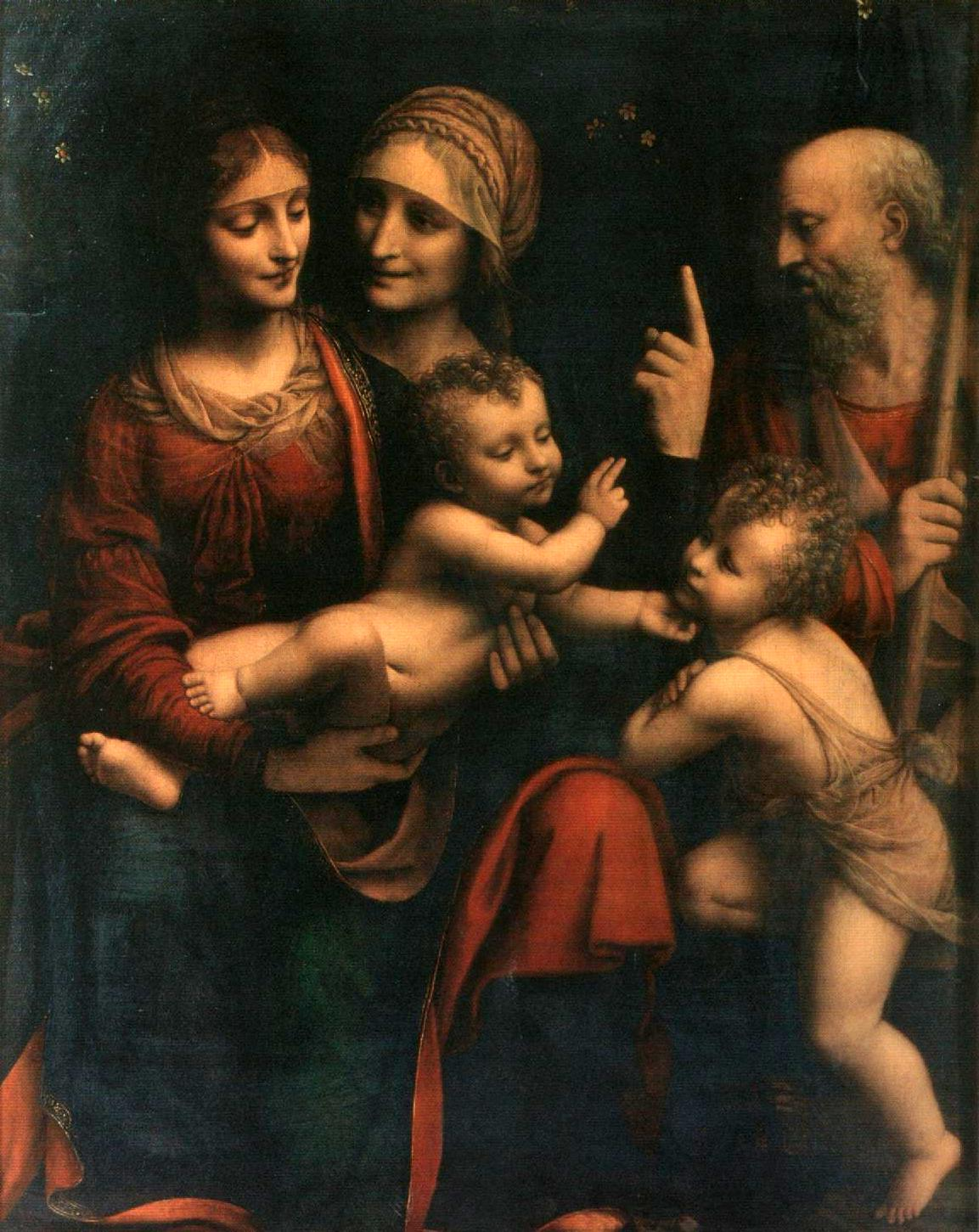
Bernardino Luini, Holy Family with Saint Anne and the infant John the Baptist

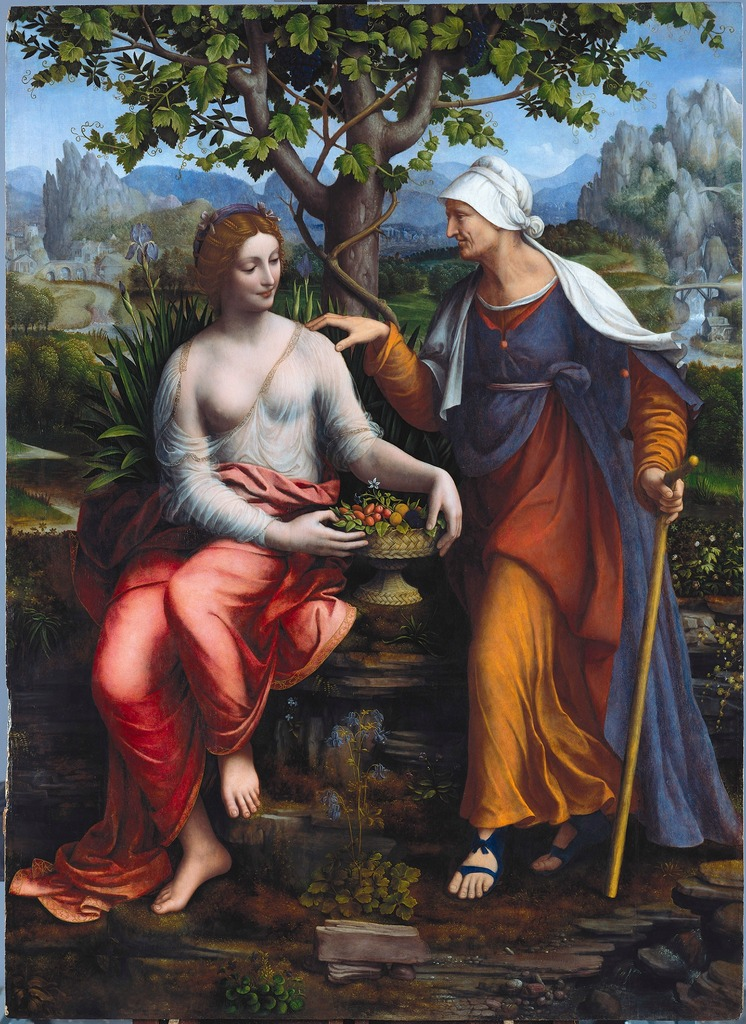
Francesco Melzi, Vertumnus and Pomona

Although apparently not being developed into a painting by Leonardo, the drawing was used as a source for the paintings of others.

A painting based on the cartoon was made by Bernardino Luini. He was a pupil of Leonardo. Its subject differs from Leonardo's in that it includes St. Joseph. Luini's painting now is in the Biblioteca Ambrosiana, in Milan.

The figure of Pomona in Francesco Melzi's painting, Vertumnus and Pomona, that is held in the Gemäldegalerie in Berlin, is based on that of the Virgin in this cartoon by Leonardo. The similarity may be seen most distinctively in the head. Melzi was another one of da Vinci's pupils, one who played a significant role in his life. He would become the literary executor of all of da Vinci's papers and whose curation of them, led to the preservation of many of them into book form. He also drew a portrait of da Vinci that is among the few confirmed images of him.

== History ==
The date and place of execution of the cartoon is disputed. The earliest reference to it is by the biographer Giorgio Vasari who, writing in the mid sixteenth century, says that the work was created while Leonardo was in Florence, as a guest of the Servite Monastery. Vasari says that for two days people young and old flocked to see the drawing as if they were attending a festival. This would date the cartoon to about 1500.

A date of 1498–99 is put on the work by Padre Sebastiano Resta, who wrote to Giovanni Pietro Bellori saying that Leonardo had drawn the cartoon in Milan at the request of Louis XII of France. While this date has gained wide acceptance, the association with Louis XII has not. More recent historians have dated the work as early as the mid 1490s and, in the case of Carlo Pedretti and Kenneth Clark, as late as 1508–1510. Martin Kemp notes that the hydraulic engineering images appearing among the sketches in the preparatory drawing in the British Museum dates the composition to around 1507–1508, when Leonardo was making similar studies in the Codex Atlanticus.

In the seventeenth century, the drawing belonged to the Counts Arconati of Milan. In 1721, it passed to the Casnedis, then to the Sagredo in Venice. In 1763, it was acquired by Robert Udny. By 1791, it was inventoried as belonging to the Royal Academy, in London. The cartoon is sometimes still known as the "Burlington House Cartoon", a title once used frequently in reference to the building of the Royal Academy which housed the drawing.

In 1962, the cartoon was put up for sale with an asking price of £800,000 (equivalent to £14,931,588 in 2025). Amid fears that it would find an overseas buyer, it was exhibited in the National Gallery where it was seen by more than a quarter of a million people in a little more than four months, many of whom made donations in order to keep the artwork in the United Kingdom. The price was eventually met by donations, thanks in part to contributions from the National Art Collections Fund. Ten years after its acquisition, John Berger wrote derisively that "It has acquired a new kind of impressiveness. Not because of what it shows – not because of the meaning of its image. It has become impressive, mysterious because of its market value".

In 1987, the cartoon was attacked in an act of vandalism with a sawn-off shotgun from a distance of approximately seven feet. The shooter was identified as a mentally ill man by the name of Robert Cambridge, who claimed he committed this act in order to bring attention to "political, social and economic conditions in Britain". The blast shattered the glass covering, causing significant damage to the artwork that has since been restored.

== See also ==
- List of works by Leonardo da Vinci
- The Virgin and Child with Saint Anne (cartoon)

== Sources ==
- Zöllner, Frank (2019) [2003]. Leonardo da Vinci: The Complete Paintings and Drawings (Anniversary ed.). Cologne: Taschen. ISBN 978-3-8365-7625-3.
