= Vertumnus and Pomona =

Vertumnus and Pomona may refer to:

- Vertumnus and Pomona (Claudel), a 1905 sculpture by Camille Claudel
- Vertumnus and Pomona (Melzi), a painting by Francesco Melzi completed c. 1518–1522
- Vertumnus and Pomona (Pontormo), a fresco painted by Jacopo Pontormo in the Medici country villa at Poggio a Caiano, Tuscany, Italy

== See also ==
- Vertumnus, the god of seasons, change, and plant growth in Roman mythology
- Pomona (mythology), a goddess of fruitful abundance in Roman mythology
