= Holy Family with Saints Anne and John the Baptist =

Holy Family with Saints Anne and John the Baptist may refer to:

- Holy Family with Saints Anne and John the Baptist (Luini)
- Holy Family with Saints Anne and John the Baptist (Mantegna)
