= Gli amori son finestre =

Live album by Mango
- Released: 2009
- Genre: Pop, rock
- Label: Columbia records, Sony Music
- Producer: Mango, Rocco Petruzzi

Mango chronology
L'albero delle fate (2007)	Gli amori son finestre (2009)	La terra degli aquiloni (2011)

Gli Amori Son Finestre is the second live album of Italian singer Mango, published in 2009 and part of the Acchiappanuvole Tour.

The album contains twenty-nine tracks, including two unreleased songs and one poem recited by actor Flavio Insinna, entitled "Gli Amori Son Finestre".

Francesco Melzi's painting Flora was used for the album cover.

== Disco 1 ==
1. E poi di nuovo la notte (unreleased track)
2. Contro tutti i pronostici (unreleased track)
3. Gli amori son finestre (poetry)
4. Intro
5. Pride
6. Luce
7. La canzone dell'amore perduto
8. Amore bello
9. Mediterraneo
10. Dio mio no
11. La rosa dell'inverno
12. Lei verrà
13. Come Monna Lisa
14. La stagione dell'amore
15. Bella d'estate

== Disco 2 ==
1. Australia
2. Chissà dove te ne vai
3. Quando
4. Il dicembre degli aranci
5. Ti porto in Africa
6. Love
7. Come l'acqua
8. Sirtaki
9. Amore per te
10. Sentirti
11. Oro
12. Chissà se nevica
13. I migliori anni della nostra vita
14. La rondine
