= Vertumnus and Pomona (Melzi) =

Painting by Francesco Melzi

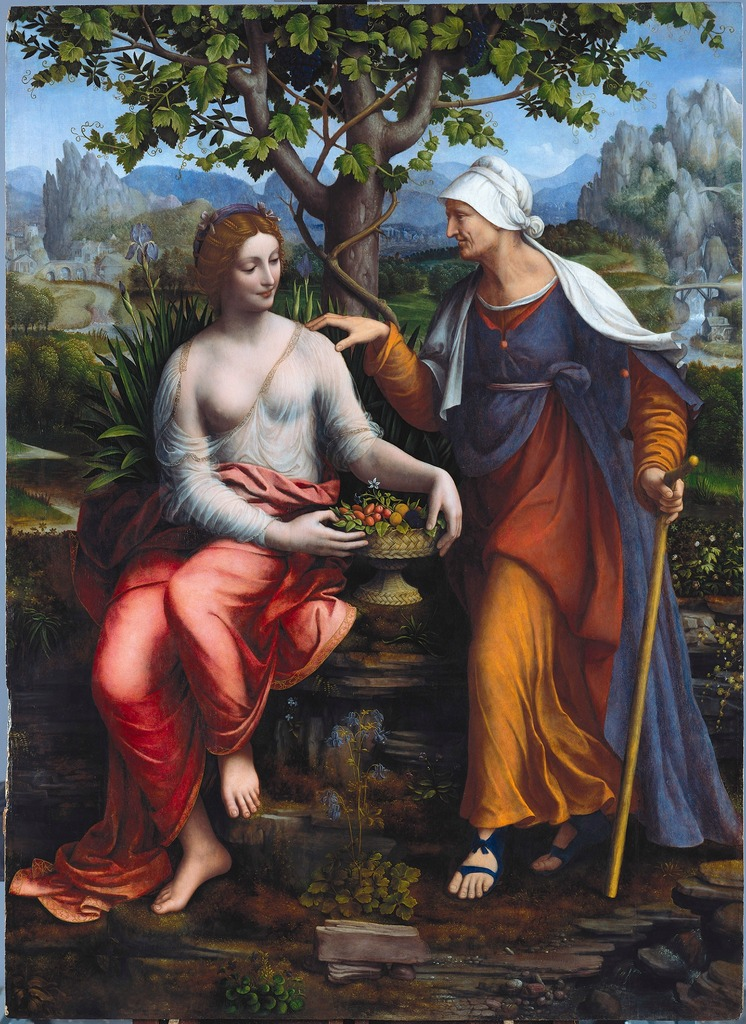
- Artist: Francesco Melzi
- Year: c. 1518–1522
- Medium: oil on panel transferred to canvas
- Movement: Leonardeschi
- Dimensions: 186 cm × 135.5 cm (73 in × 53.3 in)
- Location: Berlin State Museums, Gemäldegalerie, Berlin
- Accession: 222

Vertumnus and Pomona is a painting by Francesco Melzi dated to c. 1518–1522. It depicts the Roman god of the seasons Vertumnus in the guise of an old woman attempting to woo the lady Pomona. It is in the collection of the Gemäldegalerie of the Berlin State Museums.

== Analysis ==
Vertumnus and Pomona is painted in the style typical of the Leonardeschi, utilizing Leonardo da Vinci's female facial type with downcast eyes and tight smile, Leonardo's sfumato technique, and reflecting Leonardo's observation of botany. The painting likewise draws from known Leonardo compositions from before 1513: For example, Melzi's painting had the same color scheme as Leonardo's Virgin and Child with Saint Anne at the Louvre. The tall mountains in the background, especially including the arched bridge on the left, are drawn from the background of the Mona Lisa. In addition, the pose of Pomona is closely related to the pose of the Virgin Mary in Leonardo's drawing called the Burlington House Cartoon in the National Gallery.

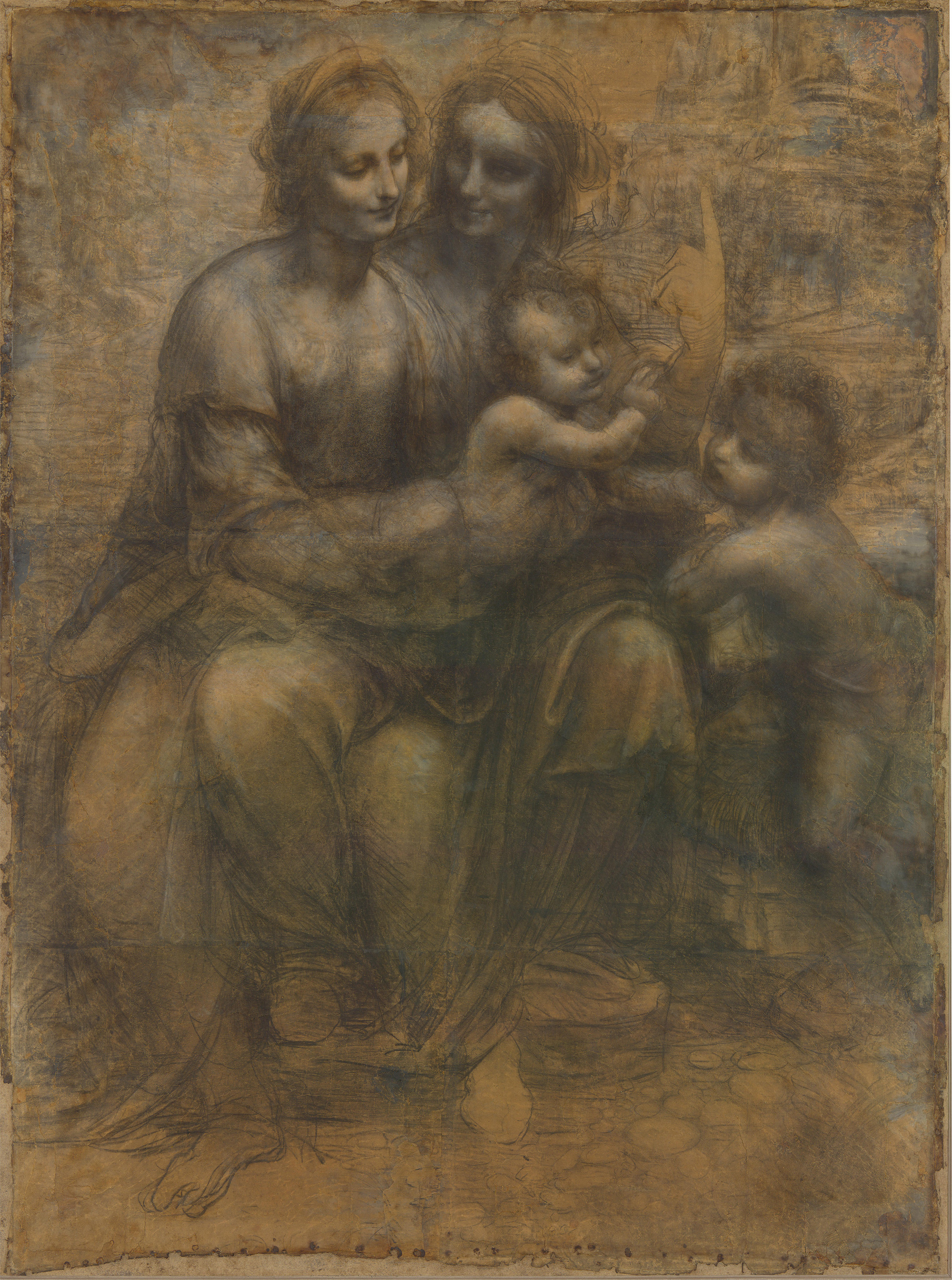
Leonardo da Vinci, The Burlington House Cartoon, c. 1500. Charcoal and white chalk on paper mounted to canvas, 141.5 x 104.6 cm. National Gallery, London (NG6337).

Much of the interpretation of the painting comes from the symbolism of the plants surrounding the figures that would have been understood by 16th and 17th century viewers. Primary of these is the elm and vine tree in the center of the composition. The painting depicts a scene from book XIV of Ovid's Metamorphoses that describes Vertumnus trying to convince Pomona to love using the parable of the elm and the vine. Pruned elm trees were often used as supports for vines and so Latin authors often took the two together as a symbol of marriage. In the immediate foreground is a growth of columbine, a symbol of fertility that is likewise prominent in Melzi's Flora.

== Attribution ==
Vertumnus and Pomona has been mistaken for the work of Leonardo, such as while it was in the collection of Frederick the Great. The painting however has a longstanding, though debated, attribution to Francesco Melzi. The first to attribute the painting to Melzi was the art historian Pierre-Jean Mariette (1694–1774). An early but uncertain attribution to Melzi came from the art historian Giovanni Morelli in 1877. In 1905, Wilhelm von Bode confirmed Melzi as the artist of this painting as well as of Flora at the Hermitage Museum in Saint Petersburg. In discussing Morelli's attribution, Marion Wilcox argued in 1919 that Melzi is the only possible author as the only alternative would be Giampietrino. To Wilcox, Giampietrino's work never achieved the "distinction" seen in Vertumnus and Pomona. In 1929, William Suida likewise gave the painting to Melzi based on the stylistic relationship to Leonardo.

There have been detractors from an attribution to Melzi as well. Georg Hirth and Richard Muther argued in 1889 that it could not have been painted by Melzi because there was little sixteenth-century evidence to suggest that Melzi was anything more than a "dilettante in painting." Rodman Henry acknowledged in 1959 that this painting and Flora at the Hermitage Museum shared a similar style, but agreed there was too little evidence to suggest Melzi was a practicing artist, writing: "There is no proof in any form that would indicate that Melzi left a single painting." He noted that, even though Melzi was with Leonardo until the master's death in 1519 at Chateau Cloux in France, Leonardo never wrote about Melzi as an artist.

Remnants of Melzi's signature were uncovered in 1995, which survive as the Greek letters S and H on a rock near the foot of Vertumnus. This matches early descriptions that the painting maintained the signature until at least the eighteenth century. The signature was likely removed so the painting could be sold as a Leonardo.

== Provenance ==
The known provenance of the painting is as follows:

- 18th century, collection of Duke of Saint-Simon, Paris
- 1771, collection of Frederick the Great, Sanssouci (No.44 of the gallery, after the list of M. Austria) as by Leonardo da Vinci
- 1820, purchased from von Hurt by the Gemäldegalerie of the Berlin State Museums (no. 222) as by Salaì
