= The Gourd and the Palm-tree =

West Asian fable

The Gourd and the Palm-tree is a rare fable of West Asian origin that was first recorded in Europe in the Middle Ages. In the Renaissance a variant appeared in which a pine took the palm-tree's place and the story was occasionally counted as one of Aesop's Fables.

== The fable and its history ==
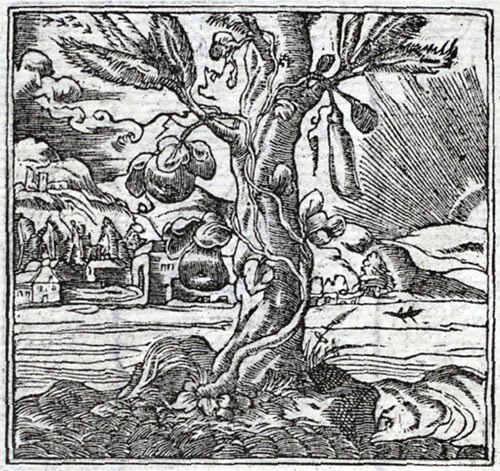
The emblem of the gourd in the Lyon edition of Andrea Alciato's Emblemata (1550)

The fable first appeared in the west in the Latin prose work Speculum Sapientiae (Mirror of wisdom), which groups its accounts into four themed sections. At one time attributed to the 4th century Cyril of Jerusalem, the work is now thought to be by the 13th century Boniohannes de Messana.

The story is told of a gourd that roots itself next to a palm tree and quickly equals her in height. The gourd then asks its sister her age and on learning that she is a hundred years old thinks itself better because of its rapid rise. Then the palm explains that slow and mature growth will endure while swift advancement is followed by as swift a decay. At the time it first appeared in Europe, the account was directed against the new rich in a feudal society which had yet to find a place for them.

The Speculum Sapientiae was eventually translated into German under the title Das buch der Natürlichen weißheit by Ulrich von Pottenstein (c. 1360–1417) and first printed in 1490. In 1564 a poetic version of the fable was included under its Latin title of Cucurbita et Palma in Hieronymus Osius' Fabulae Aesopi carmine elegiaco redditae and so entered the Aesopic tradition. In the 18th century it was adapted by August Gottlieb Meissner (1753–1807) and published with the work of other German fabulists in 1783. An anonymous translation later appeared in the New York Mirror in 1833 and a poetic version by Mrs Elizabeth Jessup Eames in the Southern Literary Messenger in 1841.

This new version of the fable ran as follows in its American prose translation:

A gourd wrapped itself round a lofty palm and in a few weeks climbed to its very top.
'And how old mayest thou be?' asked the newcomer; 'About a hundred years,' was the answer.
'A hundred years and no taller? Only look, I have grown as tall as you in fewer days than you can count years.'
'I know that well,' replied the palm; 'every summer of my life a gourd has climbed up round me, as proud as thou art, and as short-lived as thou wilt be.'

== The emblematic gourd ==
During the vogue for Emblem books in the 16th–17th centuries, the gourd was taken as the symbol of evanescence and became associated with a new version of the fable in which a pine took the place of the palm-tree. Its first appearance was in the Latin poem by Andrea Alciato that accompanied what was to become Emblem 125 (on brief happiness) in his Emblemata. A translation of this runs: 'A gourd is said to have sprung up close to an airy pine tree, and to have grown apace with thick foliage: when it had embraced the pine's branches and even outstripped the top, it thought it was better than other trees. To it spoke the pine: Too brief this glory, for soon to come is that which will completely destroy you – winter!'

One of the first of the English emblem writers, Geoffrey Whitney, borrowed Alciato's device for his own treatment of the theme of 'happiness that endures only for a moment' in his Choice of Emblemes, published in Leiden by Christopher Plantin in 1586 (p. 34). It was accompanied by a 24-line poem, retelling the fable and reflecting upon it. Two of its four stanzas are given to the pine's reply when the gourd presumes to deride his host:

To whome the Pine, with longe Experience wise,
And ofte had seene suche peacockes loose theire plumes,
Thus aunswere made, thow owght'st not to despise,
My stocke at all, oh foole, thow much presumes.

In coulde and heate, here longe hath bene my happe,
Yet am I sounde and full of livelie sappe.

But, when the froste and coulde shall thee assaie,
Thowghe nowe alofte, thow bragge, and freshlie bloome,
Yet, then thie roote shall rotte and fade awaie,
And shortlie, none shall knowe where was thy roome:

Thy fruicte and leaves, that nowe so highe aspire,
The passers by shall treade within the mire.

At the end of the following century this version of the fable reappeared in the section of fables by others in Roger L'Estrange's Fables of Aesop and Other Eminent Mythologists (1692).

A different device accompanied Johann Ebermeier's treatment of the fable in his Neu poetisch Hoffnungs-Gärtlein (new poetic pleasance of hope, Tübingen, 1653). It stands at the head of a short Latin poem with a longer German translation titled "Like a shadow and a gourd's leaf is happiness". There was also a Latin prose version of the fable included in the Mithologica sacro-profana, seu florilegium fabularum (1666) by the Carmelite priest Irenaeus. There it illustrates the moral that prosperity is short and the story is told of either a pine or an olive tree (seu olae) next to which a gourd grows, only to die lamenting in winter.

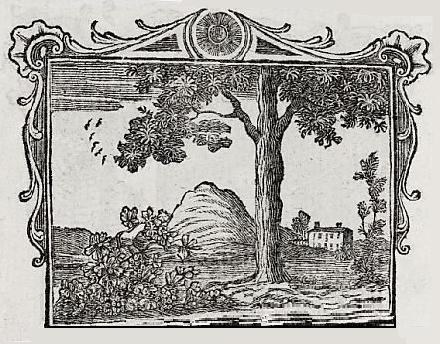
The adapted fable of "The Elm and the Vine, an illustration from Robert Dodsley's Select Fables of Esop, 1764

That the story was still known in England is suggested by Robert Dodsley's chance reference, that 'the gourd may reproach the pine' (the word Whitney used was 'deride'), in his essay on the fable genre, although he did not choose to include this one in his Select Fables of Esop and other fabulists. Instead he used an adaptation of The Elm and the Vine in the book's third section of 'original fables'. There a pert vine refuses an elm's proposal of marriage and boasts of being able to rely on its own resources. The elm replies to the 'poor infatuated shrub' that misapplication of its resources will soon bring about its downfall. In the rewriting, the original moral of the Elm and the Vine, that weakness needs support, is made to revert to the economics of the Speculum Sapientiae.

Very much the same moral is drawn from "The Oak and the Sycamore" in the same section of Dodsley's book: 'A Sycamore grew beside an Oak, and being not a little elevated by the first warm days of spring, began to shoot forth and to despise the naked Oak for insensibility and want of spirit. The Oak, conscious of his superior nature, made this philosophical reply. "Be not, my friend, so much delighted with the first precarious address of every fickle zephyr: consider, the frosts may yet return; and if thou covetest an equal share with me in all the glories of the rising year, do not afford to them an opportunity to nip thy beauties in the bud. As for myself, I only wait to see this genial warmth a little confirmed: and, whenever that is the case, I shall perhaps display a majesty that will not easily be shaken. But the tree that appears too forward to exult in the first favourable glance of spring, will ever be the readiest to droop beneath the frowns of winter.'

Dodsley's conclusion is that 'He who is puffed up with the least gale of prosperity will as suddenly sink beneath the blasts of misfortune'. While the societal moral is the same, the oak's argument that 'one swallow does not make a summer' looks back to the emblematic story of the gourd and the pine tree. To confuse matters more, the same fable (the name of the tree apart) reappears as "The Oak and the Rose Tree" in John Trotter Brockett's Select Fables (Newcastle 1820), recycling one of Thomas Bewick's woodcuts.

Similar imagery is found in an anonymous Chan poem from China which involves a pine tree and unspecified flowers:

Good deeds stand tall like a green pine, evil deeds bloom like flowers;
The pine is not as brilliant as the flowers, it seems.
When the frost comes, the pine will still stand tall,
While the flowers, withered, can be seen no more.

The pine is traditionally known as one of the 'Three Friends of Winter' in China. In the poem it is not the fact of the flower's rapid growth that makes the main contrast but the ability of the tree to withstand adverse conditions. However, in its comparison of outward show with inner virtue, the imagery is equally as emblematic as the European variant.

== A question of origin ==
The first European recorder of the fable, Boniohannes de Messana, was from the Sicilian Crusader port now called Messina, so there is the possibility that the story reached there from the Eastern Mediterranean and is of West Asian origin. Two centuries earlier than Boniohannes, it appears in the poems of the 11th century Nasir Khusraw.

Thereafter the image is often to be found in the work of other Persian poets. For example, Rumi's 13th century Persian classic, the Masnavi, employs it to picture the imitative person hasty for spiritual growth:

You run up like a gourd higher than all plants,
But where is your power of resistance or combat?
You have leant on trees or on walls,
And so mounted up like a gourd, O little dog rose;
Even though your prop may be a lofty cypress,
At last you are seen to be dry and hollow.

Later support for the oriental origin of the fable seems to be given by an American claim that a poem beginning "How old art thou? said the garrulous gourd" relates 'a Persian fable'. This was first made by Ella Rodman Church when she included it in an instructional work for children. The same poem was later reprinted in Frances Jenkins Olcott's anthology of Story-Telling Poems (New York, 1913) with the same claim. Although there is ultimately some justice in this, as we have seen, the poem itself very obviously derives from Meissner's German fable and its original (and unacknowledged) Scottish author, Charles Mackay, nowhere credits it with an Eastern origin in the collection in which it first appeared.
