= The Elm and the Vine =

Ancient fable and parable

Grape gathering from elm trellises in Italy, an 1849 illustration

The Elm and the Vine were associated particularly by Latin authors. Because pruned elm trees acted as vine supports, this was taken as a symbol of marriage and imagery connected with their pairing also became common in Renaissance literature. Various fables were created out of their association in both Classical and later times. Although Aesop was not credited with these formerly, later fables hint at his authorship.

== Marriage imagery ==
The 'marriage' of elm trees and vines continued in Italy from Roman times into the 20th century. There are references to this both in works on husbandry and in poetry. The most famous of the latter was Ovid's account of the myth of Vertumnus and Pomona in his Metamorphoses. Vertumnus takes the shape of an old woman and urges the reluctant goddess to marriage by pointing to the vine in her orchard. In the version by the work's first English translator, Arthur Golding:

Ageinst him where he sat

A goodly Elme with glistring grapes did growe: which after hee
Had praysed, and the vyne likewyse that ran uppon the tree:
But if (quoth hee) this Elme without the vyne did single stand,
It should have nothing (saving leaves) to bee desyred: and
Ageine if that the vyne which ronnes uppon the Elme had nat
The tree to leane unto, it should uppon the ground ly flat.
Yit art not thou admonisht by example of this tree
To take a husband, neyther doost thou passe to maryed bee.

The subject was commonly painted in Europe between the 16th–18th centuries, and there are examples which feature a vine trained up an elm from Italy, the Netherlands, France and England (see the Gallery below).

The theme's continuing popularity was partly encouraged by the entry of the imagery into Emblem books, beginning with the most popular of them all, Andrea Alciato's Emblemata, in which it figures under the title Amicitia etiam post mortem durans (Friendship lasting even after death). This interpretation had been influenced by a first-century CE poem by Antipater of Thessalonica in which a withered plane tree (rather than an elm) recounts how the vine trained about it keeps it green. Alciato was followed in this interpretation by Geoffrey Whitney in England, using Alciato's illustration but accompanied by verses of his own. It has been argued that William Shakespeare borrowed from this source of imagery for his The Comedy of Errors, in which Adriana reasons with Antipholus of Syracuse,"Come, I will fasten on this sleeve of thine./ Thou art an elm, my husband, I a vine,/ Whose weakness, married to thy stronger state,/ Makes me with thy strength to communicate" (2.2.166–169).

Other emblem writers who took up this theme include Otto Vaenius in his Amorum emblemata (1608), where it is interpreted as love continuing after the death of a partner; by Jean Jacques Boissard in his Emblemes latins (1588), where he takes it as a sign of undying friendship; and by Daniel Heinsius in his Emblemata Amatoria (1607), where he makes the tree a plane, following the Greek epigram, and interprets it as the sign of undying love. The French version of his Latin poem reads

Comme à la plane on voit la vigne survivante,
Mon amour survivera à l'injure du sort

– as the vine survives about the plane, So will my love the stroke of fate. Similarly Konstantin Batyushkov, with a history of borrowings from foreign sources, will later speak of receiving a beloved's last embrace "as the tendrils of the vine around the slender elm go winding" in his Russian poem "Elysium" of 1810.

Grateful dependence of a different sort was signified by the French emblem of Gilles Corrozet in his Hecatomographie (1540), where a fruiting vine acknowledges its debt to the 'little tree' that supports it. In the following century an adaptation of the emblem was adopted as printer's mark by the House of Elzevir for their press in Leiden. There a scholar picks grapes from the vine trained round the tree, on the other side of which is the Latin device Non Solus (not alone), pointing to the alliance between learning and literature.

== Vertumnus and Pomona from the 16th–19th century ==
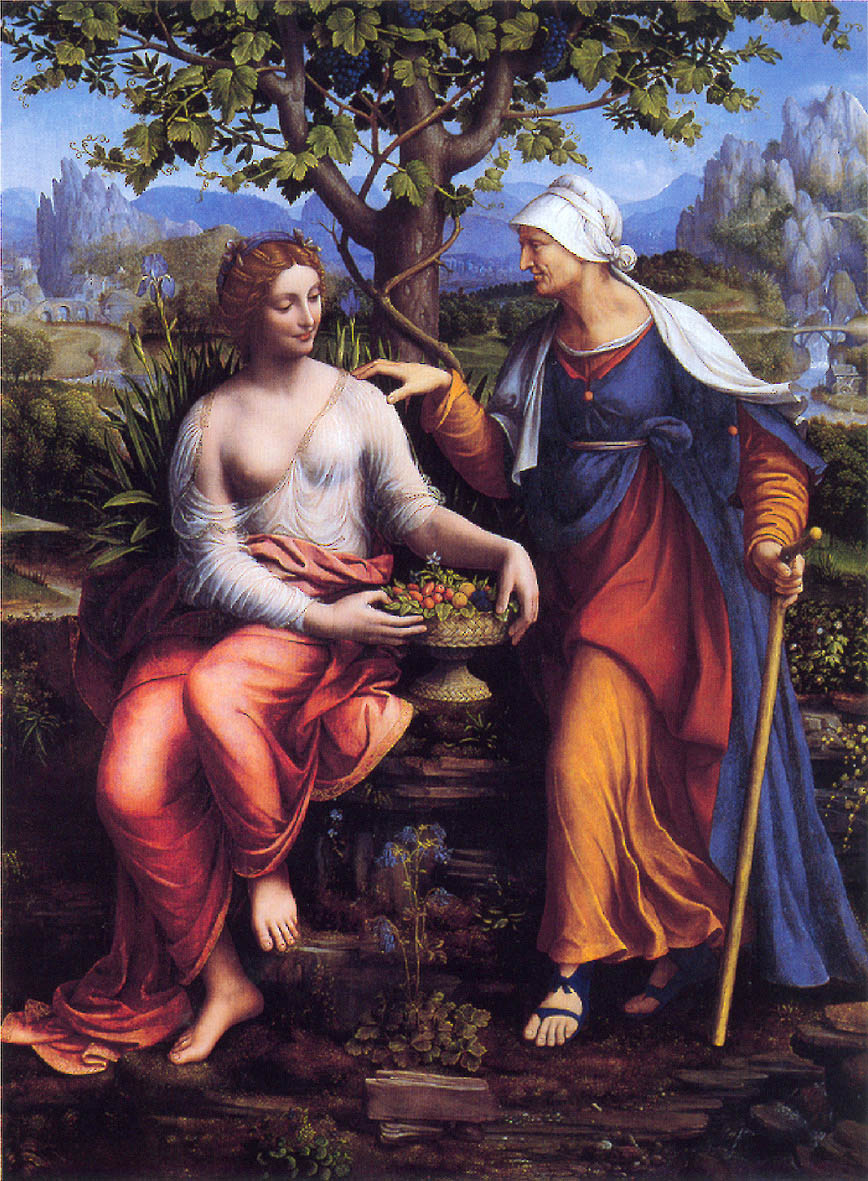
Francesco Melzi 1517–20

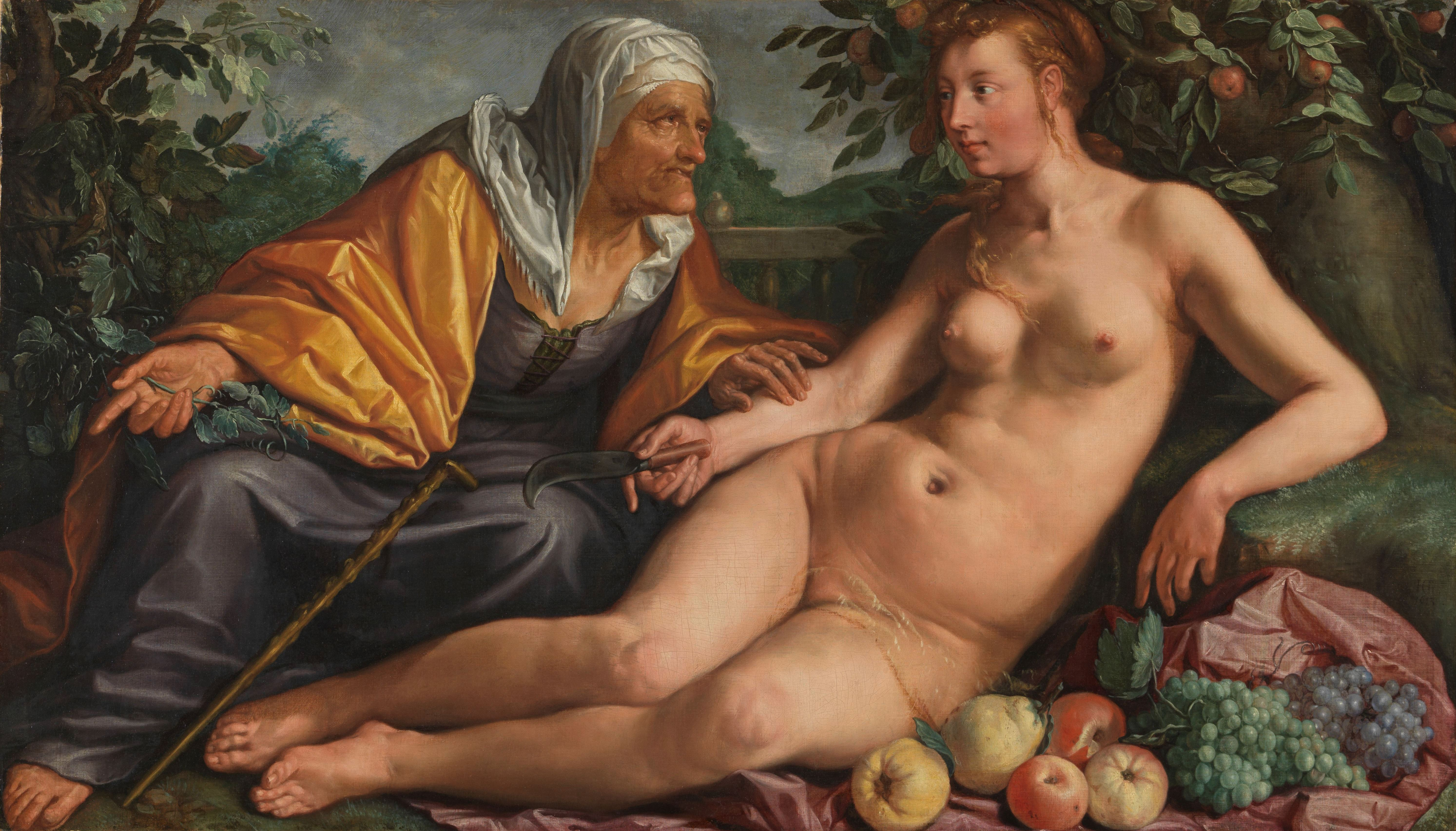
Hendrik Goltzius 1613

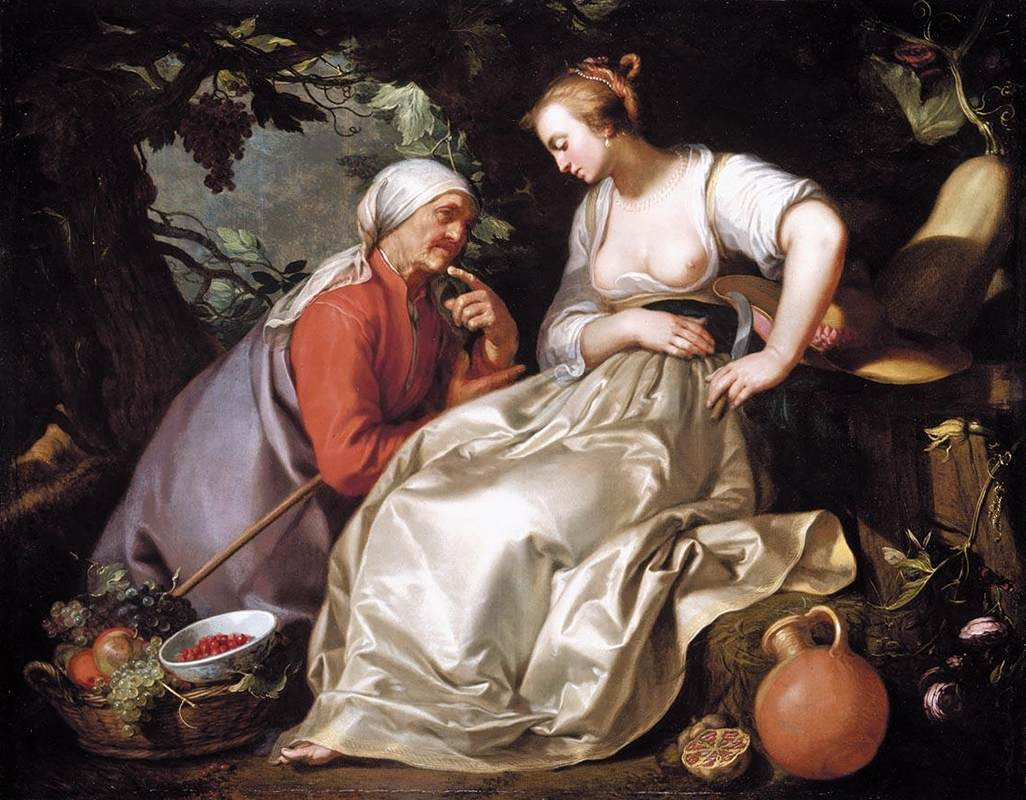
Abraham Bloemaert 1620

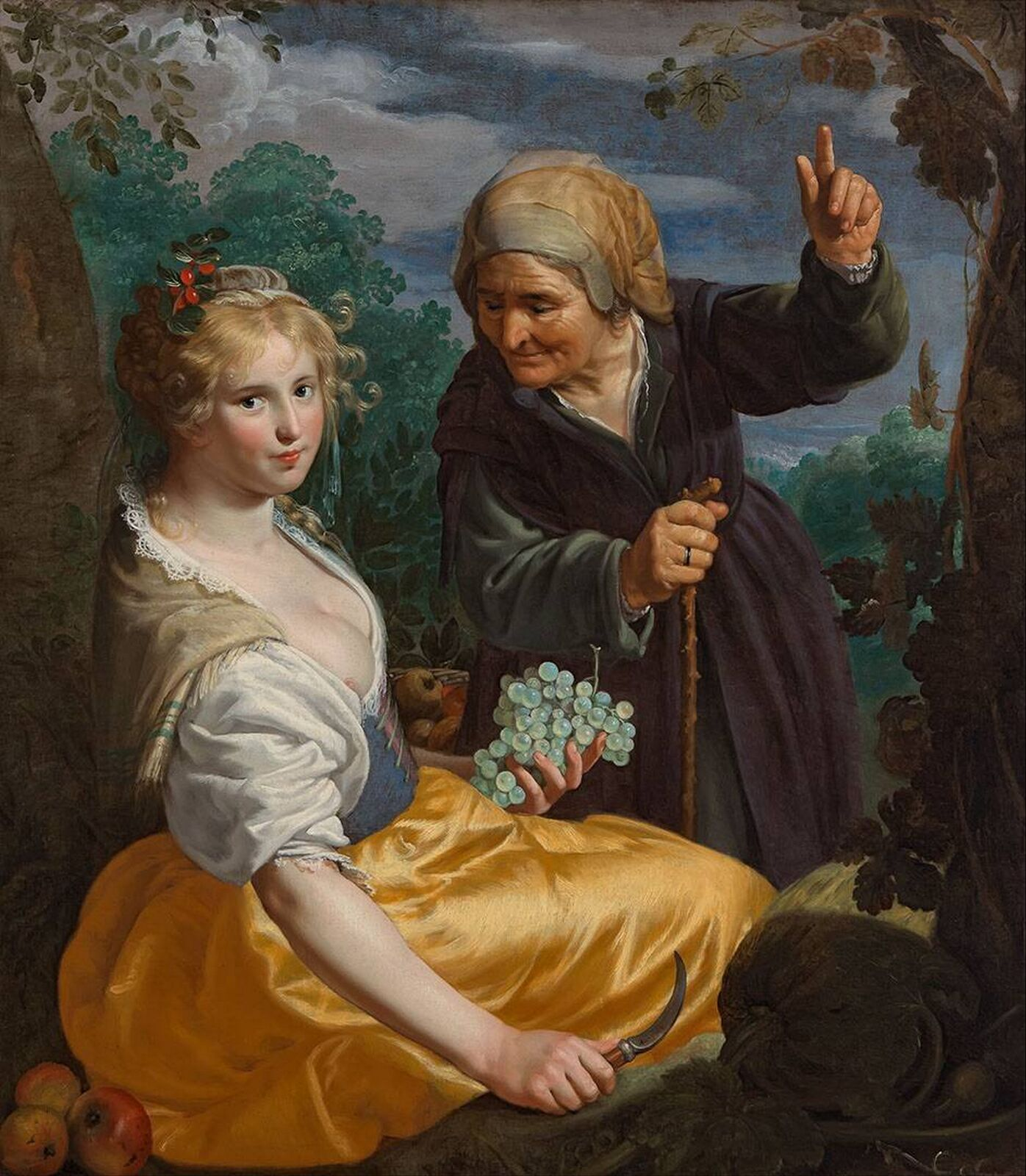
Paulus Moreelse 1630

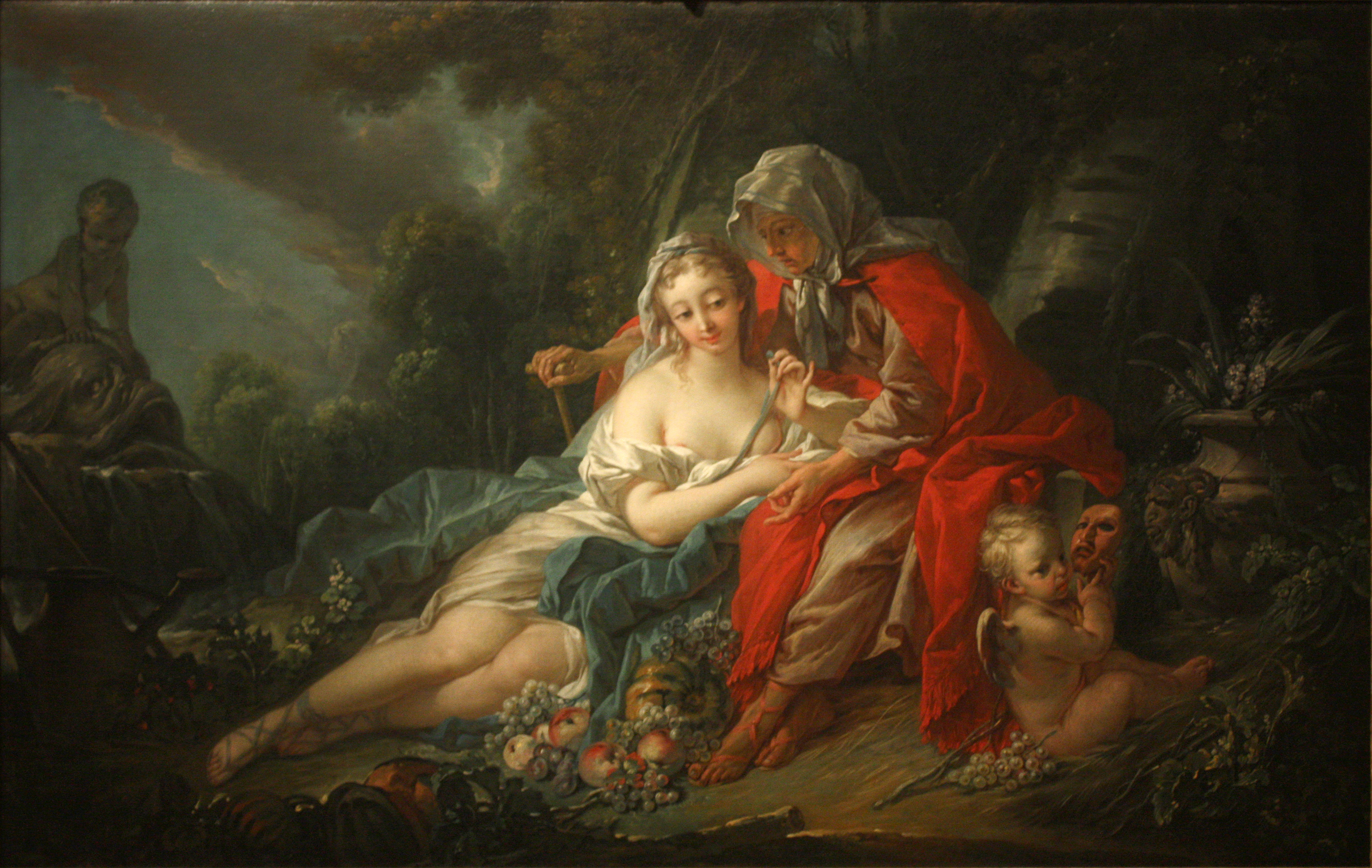
François Boucher, 1749

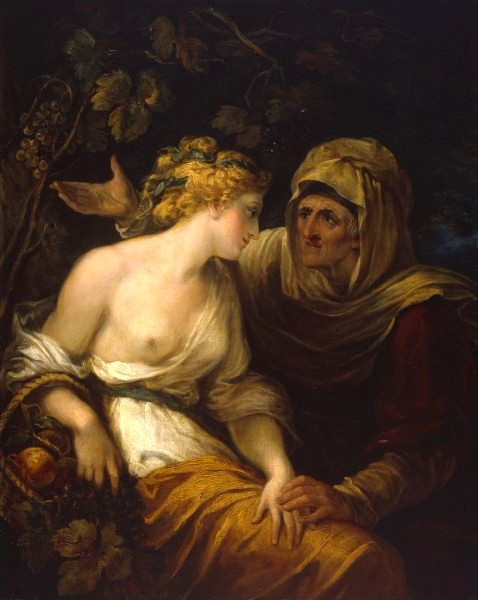
William Hamilton, 1789

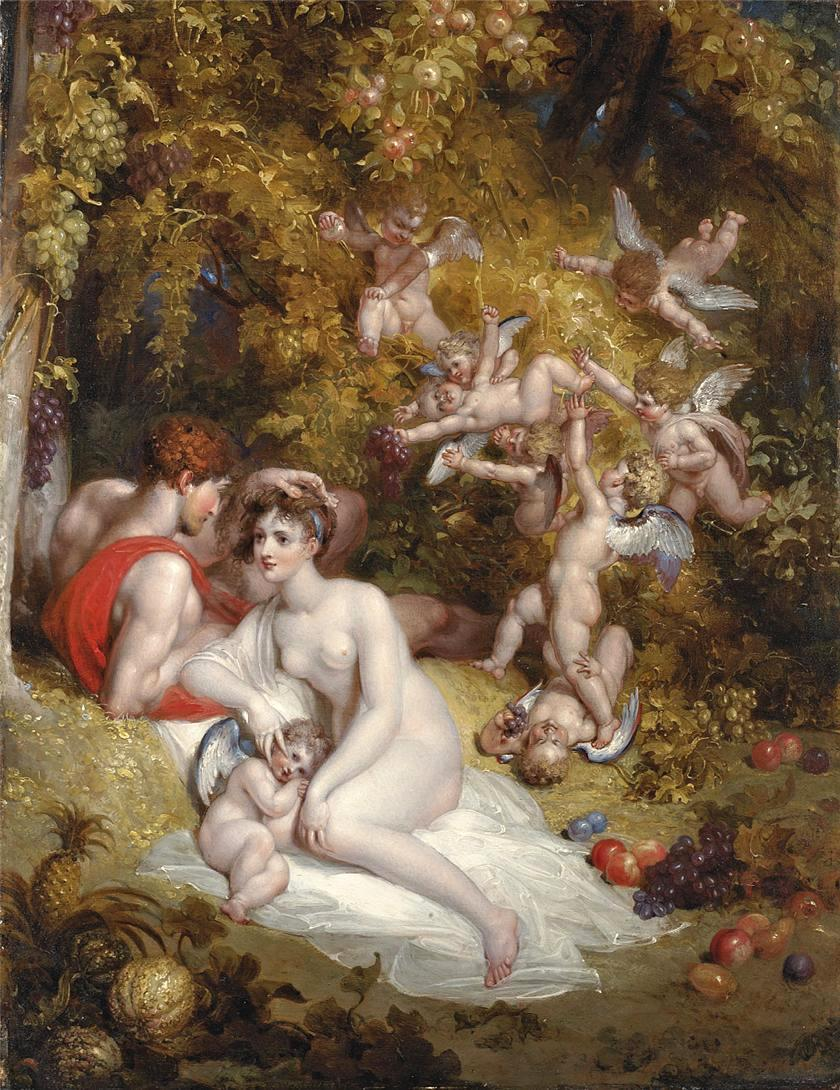
Richard Westall, early 19th century

== The fables ==
A fable, or at least a parable, of the mutual support of the unfruitful elm and the fruiting vine appeared early on in the quasi-Biblical Shepherd of Hermas. The interpretation given it there was that the rich are in need of the prayers of the poor, which they can only acquire by acts of charity. There is a return to the association with marriage in the anonymous poem "The Elm and Vine", first published in England in 1763 and reprinted elsewhere for some fifty years both there and in the USA. The story is set "In Aesop's days, when trees could speak" and concerns a vine that scorns the tree's proposal, only to take it up when beaten down by a storm. Much the same story was versified in the 19th century by the Mexican fabulist Jose Rosas Moreno, then in turn translated in a condensed version by the American poet William Cullen Bryant.

A different fable appeared in prose in Robert Dodsley's Select Fables of Esop (1764). This, however, was an adaptation of the fable of The Gourd and the Palm-tree and appeared in the book's third section of 'modern fables'. There the pert vine refused the elm's proposal and boasted of being able to rely on its own resources. The elm replies to the 'poor infatuated shrub' that misapplication of its resources will soon bring about its downfall. The text was reissued in a 1776 edition of Dodsley's work illustrated by Thomas Bewick and again in John Brocket's Select Fables (Newcastle 1820), also with Bewick's woodcut.
