= Flora (Francesco Melzi) =

Painting by Francesco Melzi

- La Columbina, Columbine
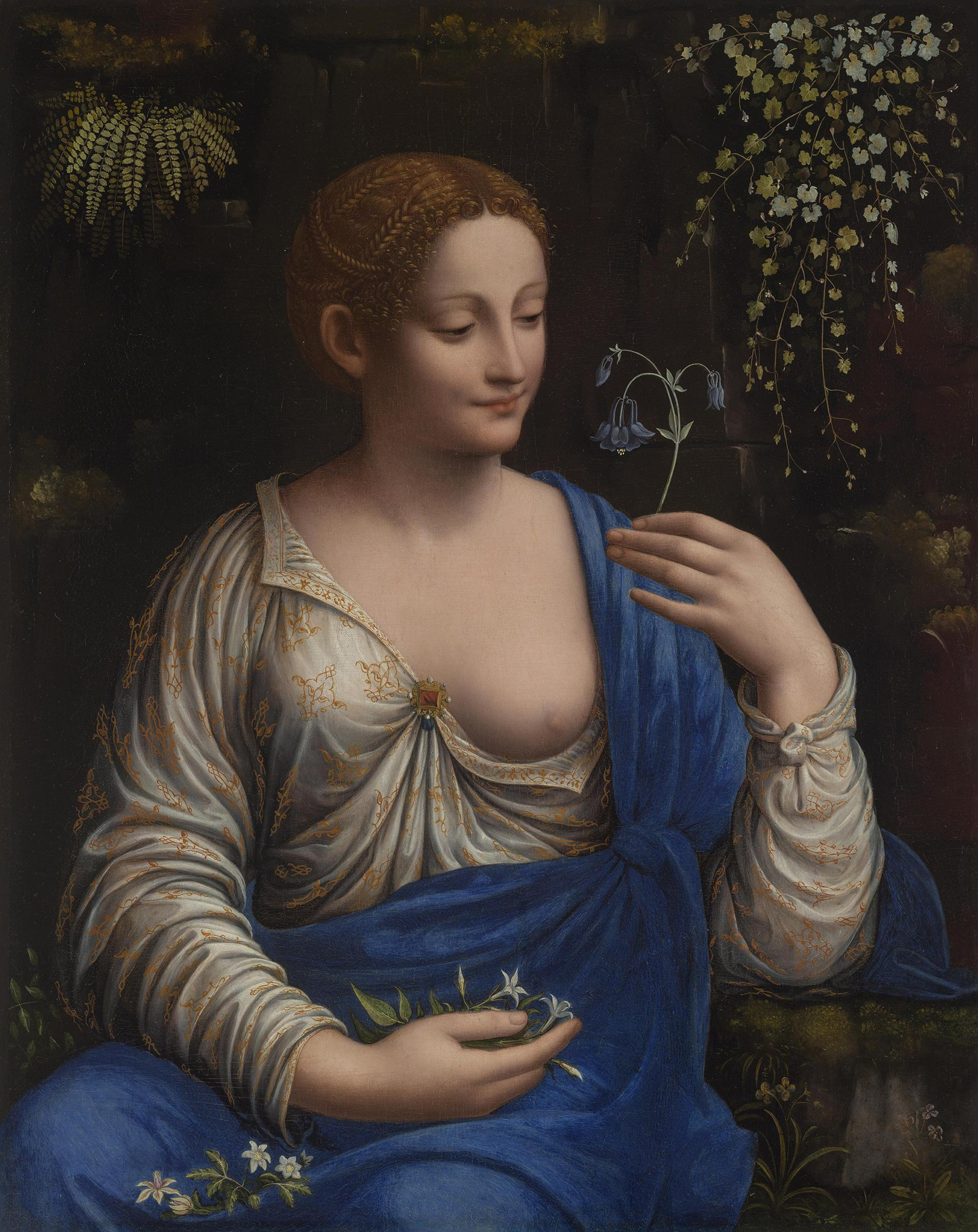
- Artist: Francesco Melzi
- Year: c. 1520
- Medium: oil on panel transferred to canvas
- Movement: High Renaissance, Leonardeschi
- Dimensions: 76 cm × 63 cm (30 in × 25 in)
- Location: Hermitage Museum, St. Petersburg
- Accession: ГЭ-107; ИР.-4564

Flora (also La Columbina or Columbine) is a painting by Francesco Melzi, completed c. 1520. It depicts the Roman mythological figure Flora, the goddess of springtime and flowers, a popular subject among Renaissance artists. The painting was in the collection of Marie de' Medici in 1649 and has been in the collection of Hermitage Museum, in St. Petersburg, since 1850.

== Analysis ==
Flora was painted in the style typical of the Leonardeschi, utilizing Leonardo da Vinci's female facial type with downcast eyes, Leonardo's sfumato technique, and displaying Leonardo's penchant for careful observation of plants and hair. In the composition, Flora is seated in a grotto, surrounded by ferns and ivy. She wears the costume of an ancient Roman, with a white stola embroidered in gold and with a blue palla thrown over one shoulder. In her lap are white jasmines, and in her left hand she holds a spray of columbine that formerly gave the painting its title.

The plants surrounding Flora held symbolic meaning for 16th and 17th century viewers. For example, the columbine, also known as aquilegia, are a symbol of fertility. Alongside Flora's exposed breast, the columbine emphasizes her role as a 'mother of flowers.' The jasmine in her proper right hand are symbolic of purity. The anemones in the folds of her palla in the lower left of the image represent rebirth. In ancient Greece, anemones were also the flower of the wind; these flowers thus also reference how Flora was married to Zephyrus, god of the West Wind. The ivy in the upper right represents eternity, and the fern in the upper left reflects the solitude of the grotto.

== Attribution ==
Melzi was a pupil of Leonardo da Vinci and the technique he used in this painting mirrors that of his teacher so well that the painting was thought to be an autograph work by Leonardo when it was purchased on behalf of Tsar Nicholas I for the Hermitage. Once at the museum, scholars attributed the painting to a variety of different Leonardeschi: In 1871, Joseph Crowe and Giovanni Cavalcaselle argued that it should be attributed to Andrea Solari; in 1892 Giovanni Morelli claimed it was painted by Giampietrino; and in 1899 George C. Williamson claimed it to be by Bernardino Luini. Claude Phillips called Flora a "puzzle" and felt that the painting had an underdrawing by Leonardo but was painted by a pupil.

The attribution of Flora to Melzi is based on close similarities between the painting and other works by the artist, especially Vertumnus and Pomona at the Gemäldegalerie in Berlin. Adolfo Venturi wrote how the "same seductive, tender feminine charms, and the same Hellenic spirit recur in the Columbina" as in Vertumnus and Pomona. Rodman Henry likewise noted this similarity, though argued there was no evidence Melzi was an artist and so the paintings couldn't be attributed to him. Traces of Melzi's signature were, however, uncovered in the lower left corner of Flora in 1963, further strengthening the attribution.

Along with Flora and Columbine, the painting has at times been called "Vanity" as well as "Gioconda." It was once also named "Portrait of Mme Babou de la Bourdaisière" when it was thought it might be a portrait of the mistress of Francis I.

== Provenance ==
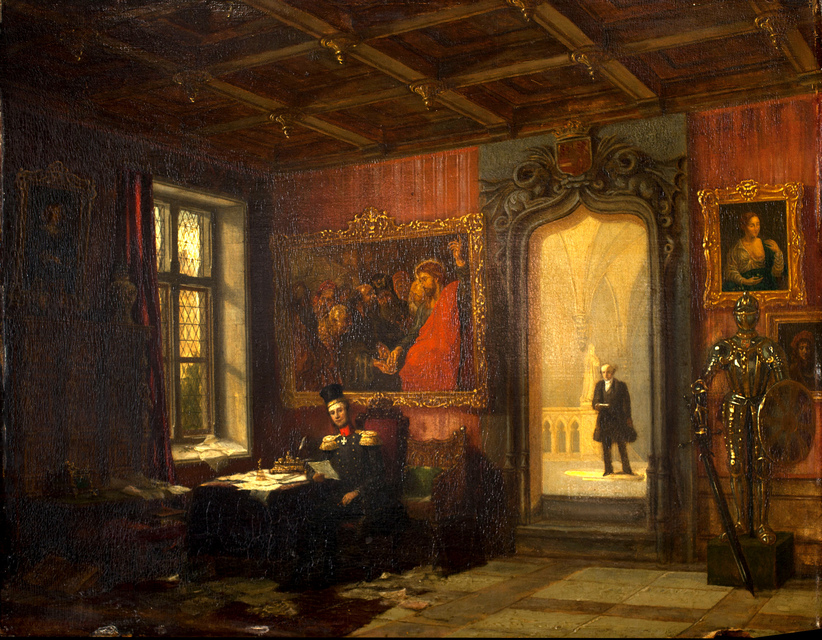
H. Wijnands, "King Willem II in the Kneuterdijk Palace in The Hague," 1847. Oil on panel, 33 x 43 cm. Stichting Historische Verzamelingen van het Huis Oranje-Nassau, The Hague. In the upper right, 'Flora' is shown hanging above a suit of armor.

The known history of the painting's ownership is as follows:

- c. 1520, Painted by Francesco Melzi.
- 1649, listed in the posthumous collection of Maria de’ Medici.
- Collection of the Duke of Orléans, probably collected by Philippe II. Then by inheritance to Louis and then to Louis Philippe II.
- 1790, Sold to Viscount Édouard de Walckiers in Brussels.
- 1824(?), sold from the collection of (Daniel?) Danoot in Brussels to William II of the Netherlands.
- 1850, sold at The Hague to Fëdor Bruni, agent of Tsar Nicholas I, for ƒ40,000. Then acquired by the Hermitage Museum, Saint Petersburg, Russia (at which point it was re-attributed to Francesco Melzi and renamed Flora).

== Condition ==
Flora was painted on wood panel which was transferred to canvas in the nineteenth century. Despite this, the paint layers are reported to be in good condition with a well-preserved underdrawing and minor losses and abrasions to the surface.

In 2019, the painting underwent a conservation treatment performed by Maria Vyacheslavovna Shulepova (Мария Вячеславовна Шулепова) of the State Hermitage Museum. Before, the painting was covered in a yellowed varnish which obscured details and flattened the appearance of the background. The varnish also made the ultramarine palla worn by Flora to appear green. Analysis of the paint layers further revealed that Melzi did not "cheat" in painting the palla by glazing expensive ultramarine over a less expensive azurite; rather, being wealthy, Melzi could afford to paint the entire garment in pure ultramarine.

== In popular culture ==
Flora appears on the cover of Italian singer Mango's 2009 album Gli amori son finestre.

In 2012, a sixteenth-century copy of Flora sold at Christie's for £937,250 to a private collector in Saint Petersburg, Russia.

== Copies ==
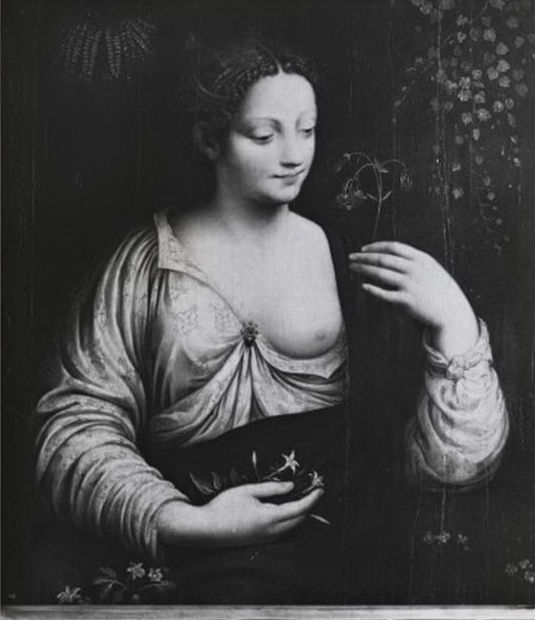
After Francesco Melzi, "La Colombina (Flora)," after mid-16th century. Oil on cradled panel, 29 1/2 × 25 in (74.93 × 63.5 cm). Virginia Museum of Fine Arts (53.29.4).

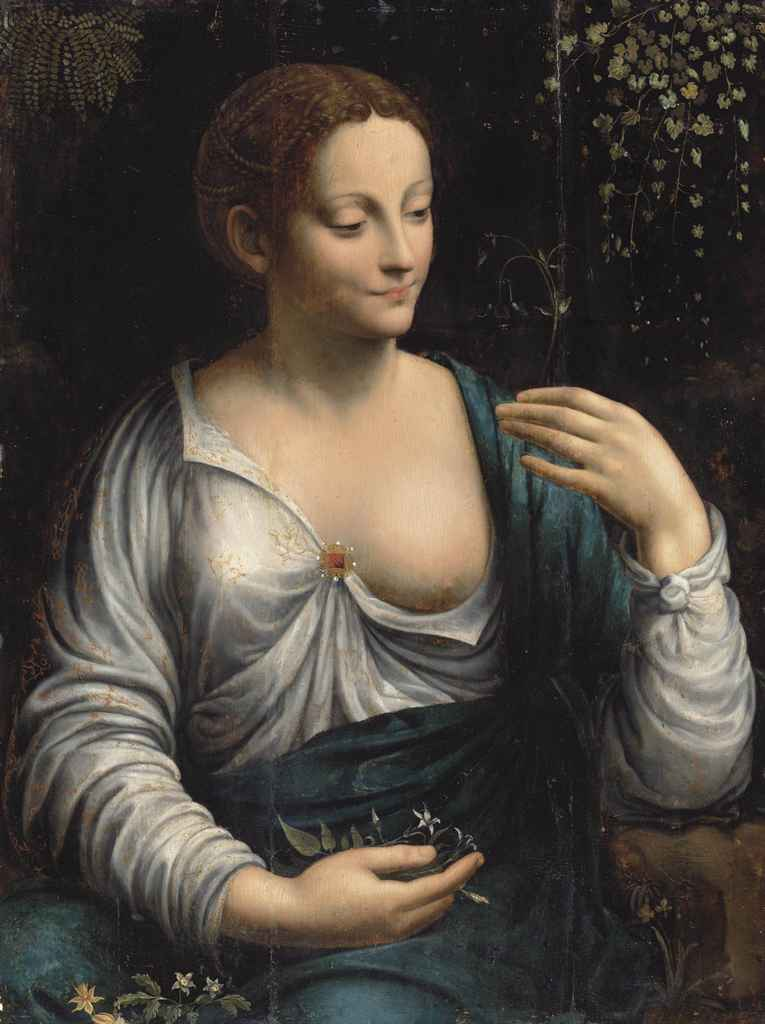
Follower of Leonardo da Vinci, "Flora," 16th century. Oil on panel, 26¾ x 20 in. (68 x 50.8 cm). Private collection, St. Petersburg (Christie's Old Master & British Painting Day Sale, London, 4 July 2012, lot 108).

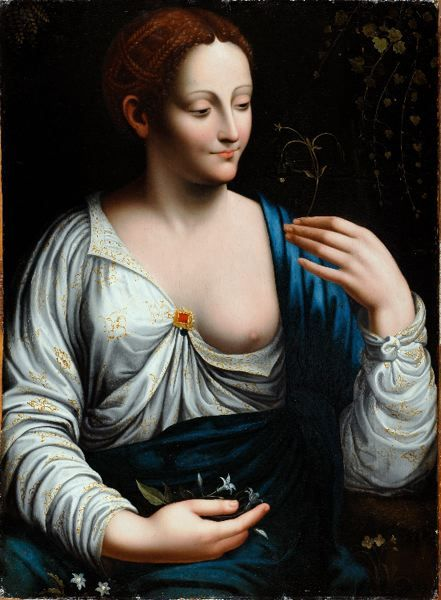
After Francesco Melzi, "Flora, or La Colombina," 16th century. Oil on panel, 64.5 x 47.7 cm. Château de Blois (869.2.15).

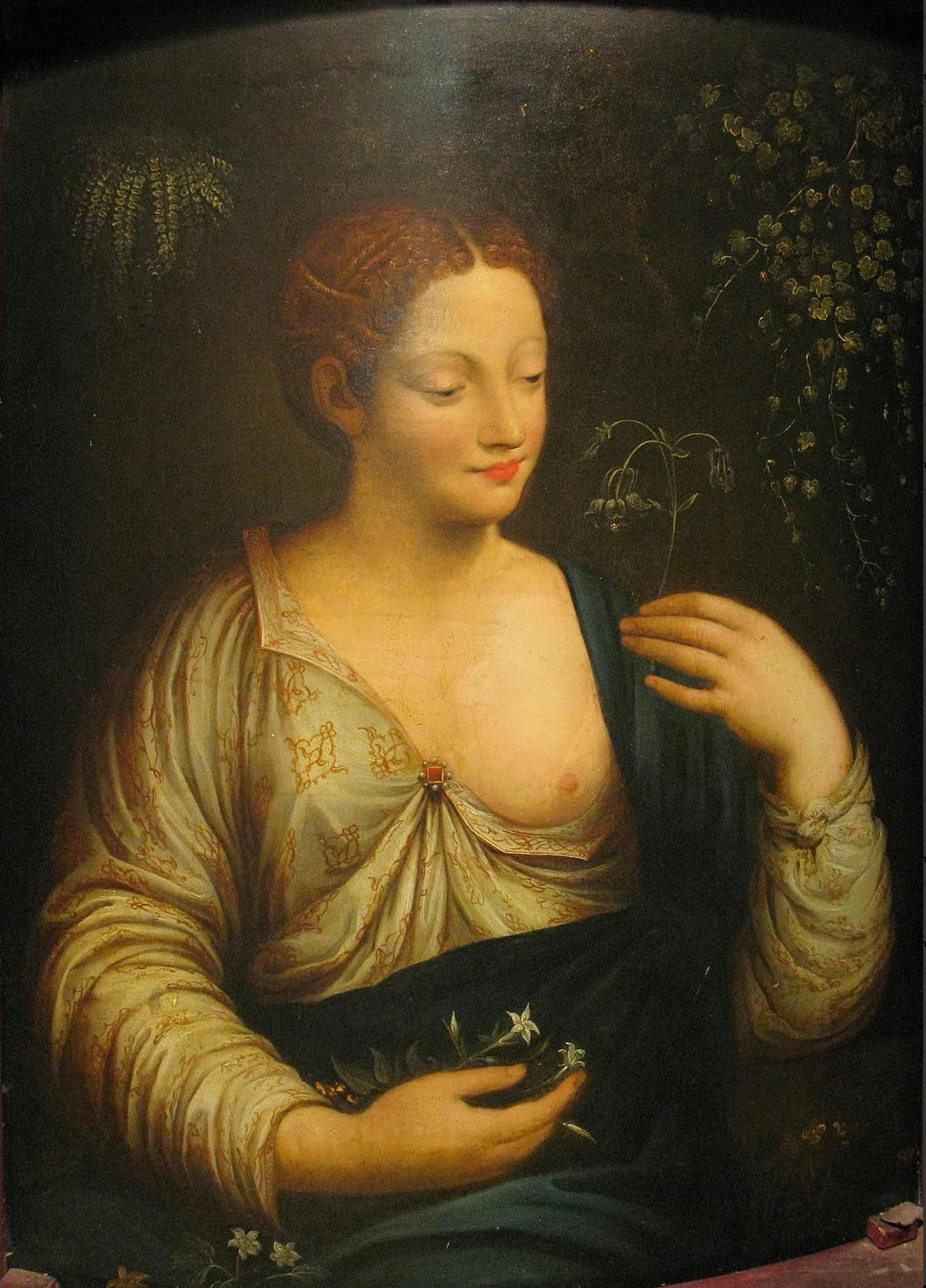
After Francesco Melzi, "Flora." Oil on panel, 30 1/4 x 22 1/2 in. Private collection (Bonhams Period Art & Design, San Francisco, 20 Jan 2013, lot 3001).

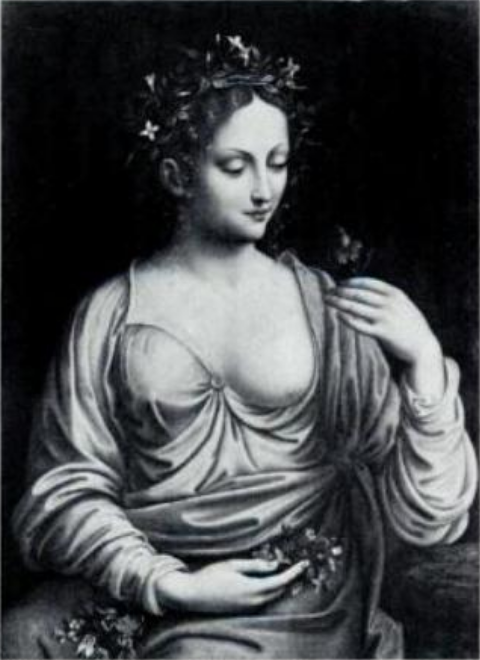
Attributed to Francesco Melzi, Flora, ca. 1510. Oil on panel. Whereabouts unknown (formerly Paris, Prince I. de Baranowicz collection).

== Further documentation ==
- E. de Bruyn, De schilderijenverzameling van Zijne Koninklijke Hoogheid de prins van Oranje te Brussel, Bulletin de la Classe des Beaux Arts, Académie Royale de Belgique 28 (1946), 155-63.
- H. E. van Gelder, De kinsteverzameling van kning Willem II, Maandlad voor de Beeldende Kunsten 24 (1948), 137-48.
- Erik Hinterding and Femy Horsch, ‘‘’A Small but choice collection’’: the art gallery of King Willem II of the Netherlands (1792-1849)’, Simiolus: Netherlands Quarterly for the History of Art 19, no.1/2 (1989), 4-122. [Which includes a ‘Reconstruction of the Collection of Old Master Paintings’ pp. 55–122. Provenance for Flora is on page 13 and 114]
- Tatyana K. Kustodieva, The Hermitage: Catalogue of Western European Painting; Italian Painting, Thirteenth to Sixteenth Centuries (Moscow and Florence: Iskusstvo Publishers, 1994), 296-7.
- Darius A. Spieth, Revolutionary Paris and the Market for Netherlandish Art (Leiden and Boston: Brill, 2018), 99 note 194 and 270-1.
- Wilhelm Suida, Leonardo und sein Kreis (Munich: 1929), 232-33, fig. 302.
