= A Treatise on Painting =

Collection of Leonardo da Vinci's writings

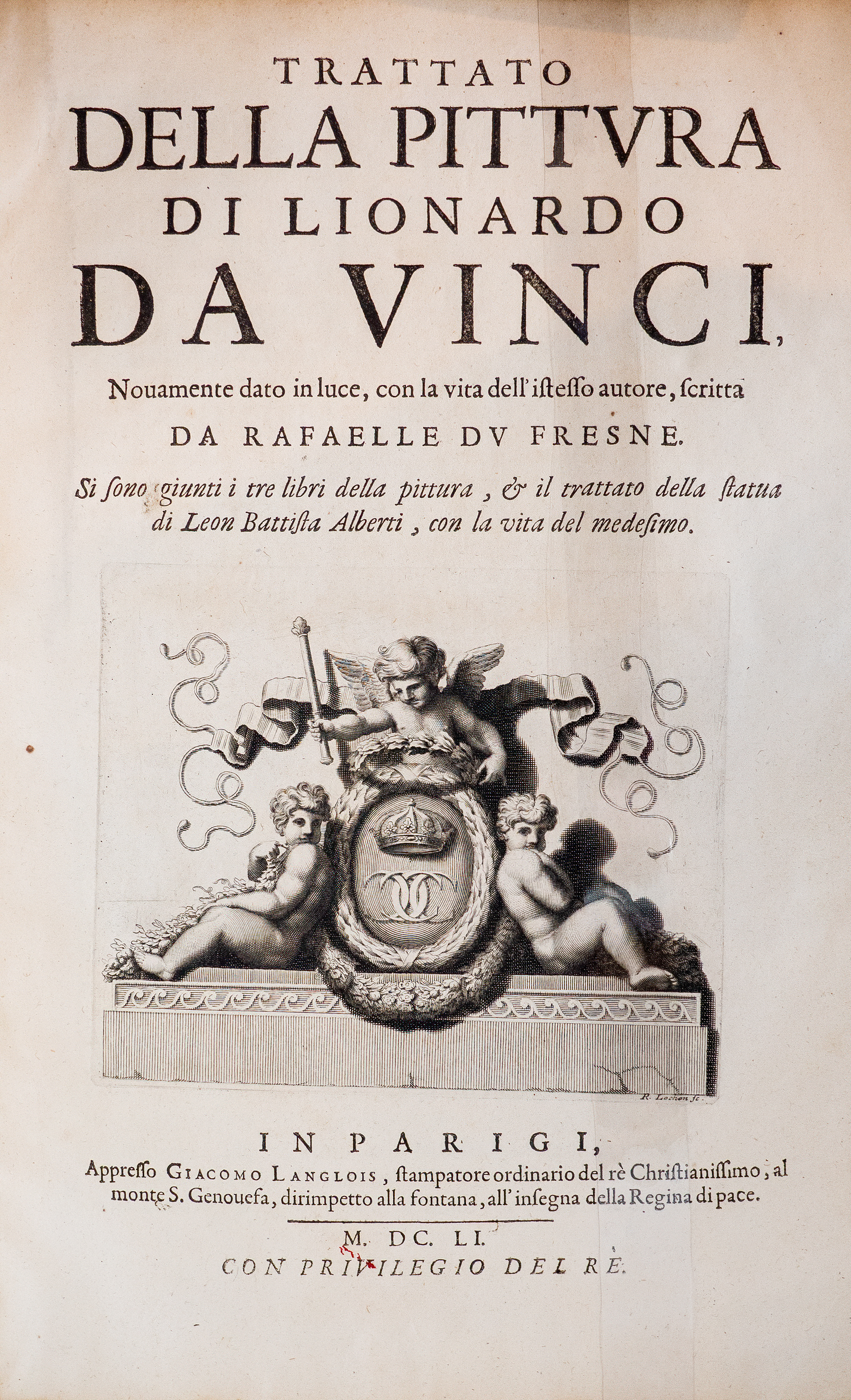
- A Treatise on Painting (Trattato della pittura), 1651

A Treatise on Painting (Trattato della pittura) is a collection of Leonardo da Vinci's writings entered in his notebooks under the general heading "On Painting". The manuscripts were begun in Milan while Leonardo was under the service of Ludovico Sforza and gathered together by his heir Francesco Melzi. An abridged version of the treatise was first published in France in 1651. After Melzi's manuscript was rediscovered in the Vatican Library, the treatise was published in its modern form in 1817.

== Content ==
The main aim of the treatise was to argue that painting was a science. Leonardo's keen observation of expression and character is evidenced in his comparison of laughing and weeping, about which he notes that the only difference between the two emotions in terms of the "motion of the [facial] features" is "the ruffling of the brows, which is added in weeping, but more elevated and extended in laughing."

This manuscript contains the famous branching rule:

All the branches of a tree at every stage of its height when put together are equal in thickness to the trunk [below them].

== History ==
The manuscripts were begun in Milan while Leonardo was under the service of Ludovico Sforza (between 1482 and 1499), being worked on substantially for the last 25 years of Leonardo's life. The works later published in this collection drew from writing of Leon Battista Alberti and Cennino Cennini. Upon Leonardo's death, he left his notebooks to his pupil and heir Francesco Melzi to be published, a task of overwhelming difficulty because of its scope and Leonardo's idiosyncratic writing. Sometime before 1542, Melzi gathered together the papers for A Treatise on Painting from 18 of Leonardo's "books" (two-thirds of which have gone missing). After Melzi's death in 1570, the collection passed to his son, the lawyer Orazio, who initially took little interest in the journals, but they were later dispersed.

It was printed in an abridged form in French and Italian as Trattato della pittura by Raffaelo du Fresne in 1651. After Melzi's version was rediscovered in the Vatican Library, the treatise was first published in its modern form in 1817.

In 1937, Max Ernst wrote in Cahiers d'Art that Leonardo's advice on the studying of stains on walls caused him an "unbearable visual obsession".

All editions of the treatise are kept at the Elmer Belt Library of Vinciana at UCLA.

== See also ==
- List of works by Leonardo da Vinci
