= Holy Family with Saints Anne and John the Baptist (Luini) =

Painting by Bernardino Luini

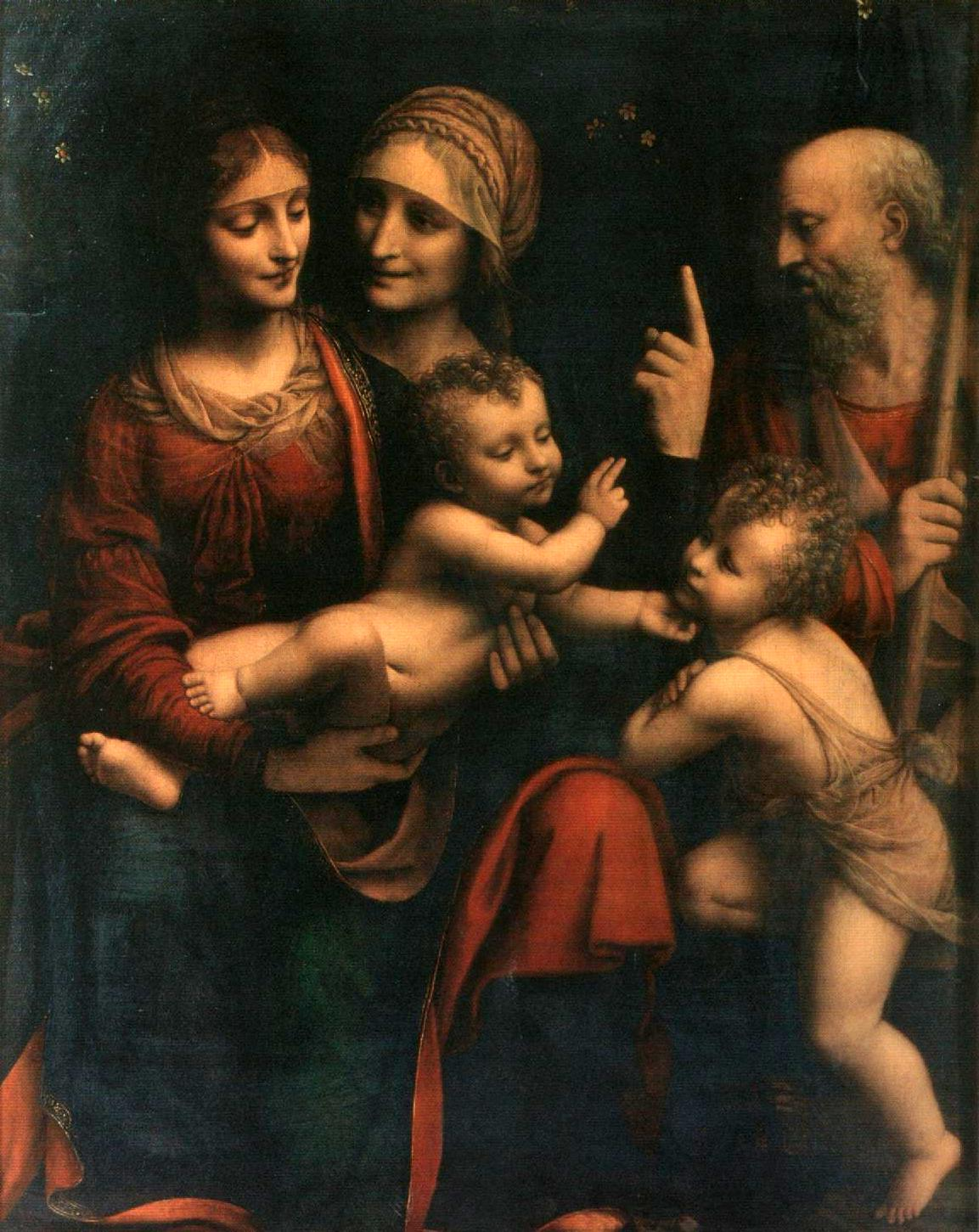
Holy Family with Saints Anne and John the Baptist (c. 1530) by Bernardino Luini

Holy Family with Saints Anne and John the Baptist is a c. 1530 oil on panel painting by Bernardino Luini. It was previously in the collection of Cardinal Federico Borromeo, who recorded his acquisition of it in his writings and gave it to the new Biblioteca Ambrosiana in Milan in 1618, where it still hangs. The work was seized in 1796 by occupying French troops and taken to Paris, where it hung in the Louvre until being returned to Milan in 1815.

Its popularity peaked in the early 20th century, at which time it hung among the Biblioteca's highlights by Raphael and Leonardo da Vinci, but declined in the second half of the century, when most art critics reinterpreted it as a superficial copy with variants after Leonardo's cartoon The Virgin and Child with Saint Anne and Saint John the Baptist (c. 1501-1505; National Gallery, London).

Luini adds the figure of Saint Joseph on the right, replaces the background landscape with a rocky outcrop covered in vegetation, cuts the scene higher to modify the Madonna's leg and feet and moves the Christ Child to the centre of the composition. The twist in Saint Anne's neck draws directly from the cartoon. The painting is also on exactly the same scale as the cartoon and may have been traced from it. Giovanni Paolo Lomazzo even records that in his time the cartoon was owned by Bernardino's son Aurelio Luini.

== See also ==
- Holy Family
