= Francesco Melzi =

Italian painter (1491–1570)

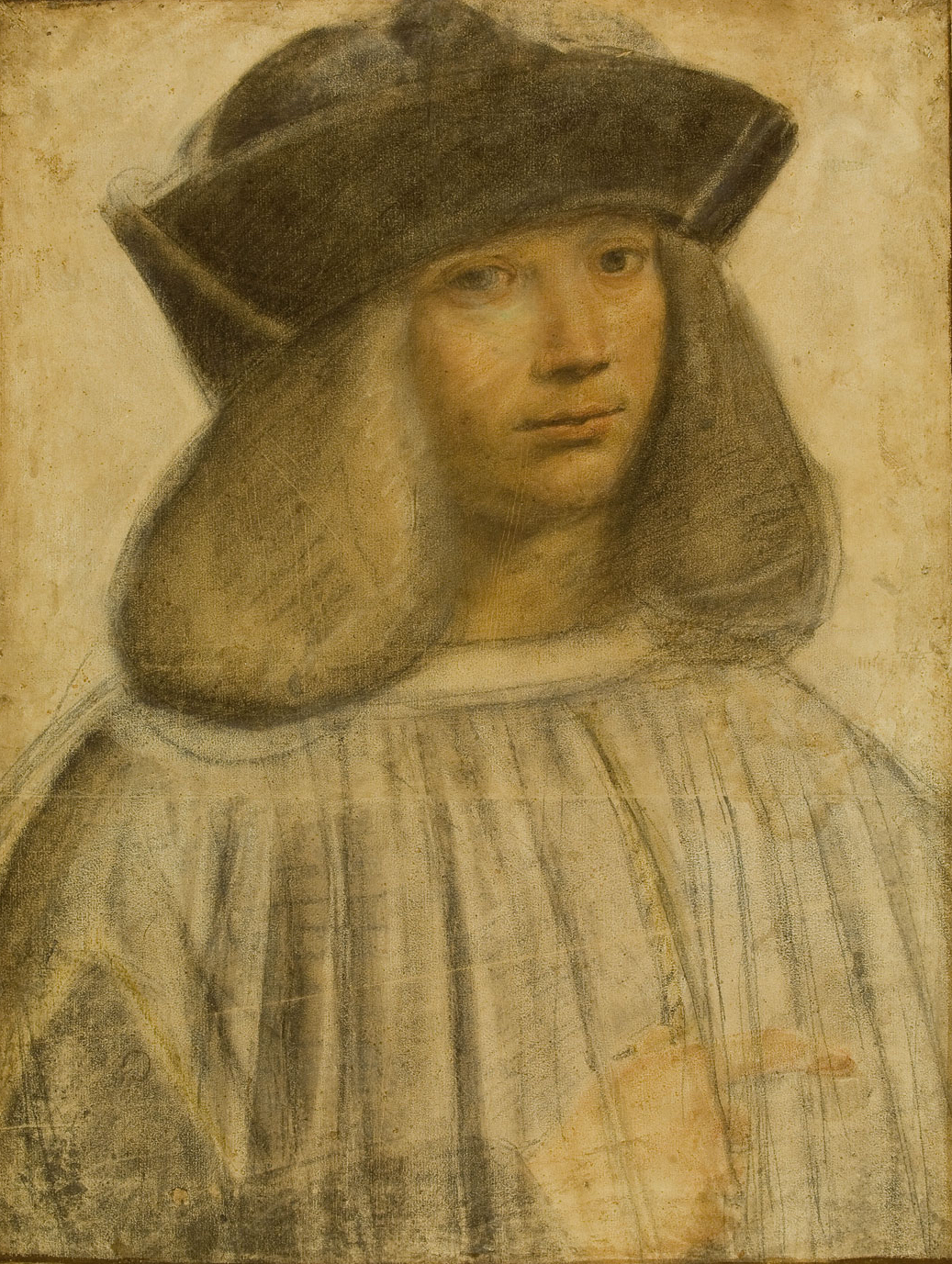
- Portrait by Giovanni Boltraffio, c. 1510–1511
- Born: 1491; Italy
- Died: 1570 (aged 78–79); Italy
- Movement: Renaissance
- Spouse: Angiola di Landriani (m. 1519)
- Patrons: Charles II d'Amboise; Francis I of France

Francesco Melzi, or Francesco de Melzi (1491 – 1570) was an Italian painter born into a family of the Milanese nobility in Lombardy. He became a pupil of Leonardo da Vinci and remained as his closest friend and professional assistant throughout his career. After Leonardo’s death, Melzi became the literary executor of all Leonardo's papers and compiled them into a manuscript known as the Codex Urbinas. This compilation later served as the basis for the Trattato della Pittura (Treatise on Painting), which was published posthumously by others based on Melzi’s organization of Leonardo’s notes.

== Early life and training ==
Born 1481, Melzi's father, Girolamo Melzi, was an engineer for Francesco II Sforza's military, and a captain in the militia in Milan under Louis XII. Francesco lived with his family in the Villa Melzi in Vaprio d'Adda (not to be confused with the Villa Melzi in Bellagio, Lombardy), which today is still under the ownership of the Dukes Melzi d'Eril. Francesco grew up in the Milanese court, was raised with proper manners and granted a good education, which included training in the arts. He was reasonably talented in the arts and worked very hard.

As a member of a prominent family of the Milanese court, however, Francesco would have had political and social responsibilities as he got older that would have caused him to discontinue his studies in art had it not been for Leonardo da Vinci. Leonardo returned to Milan for some time around 1505 and stayed with the Melzi family. It was there that he met Francesco for the first time, enticed by his good nature and handsomeness. In a biography of Leonardo da Vinci, it is argued that he felt compelled to stay in Milan longer than he had intended after meeting with the young Francesco. Francesco is described in literature as charming and graceful, an adolescent without the awkwardness or lack of manners typical of boys around this age. Francesco and another pupil of Leonardo's – Boltraffo – stood out from the other students as they were capable painters, very bright, and well-learned. Because of his upbringing in the high court, Francesco was gracious and dignified, and had a very good education. Shortly after they met, Francesco began studying and working at Leonardo's workshop and quickly became his master's favorite pupil, and the most devoted as well. Despite this, fairly little is written about the apprentice painter, and what is known about him is almost exclusively within the context of Leonardo.

Other than Melzi, none of Leonardo's pupils went on to become respected artists. And although he is not well-known, Melzi is referred to as being the first person responsible for collecting, organizing, and preserving da Vinci's notes on painting, and transforming it into a manuscript copy known as the Codex Urbinas. After Leonardo's death in 1519, Francesco returned to Italy and married Angiola di Landriani; with her he fathered eight children. One of his children, Orazio, inherited Leonardo's manuscripts after Francesco's death in 1569~1570.

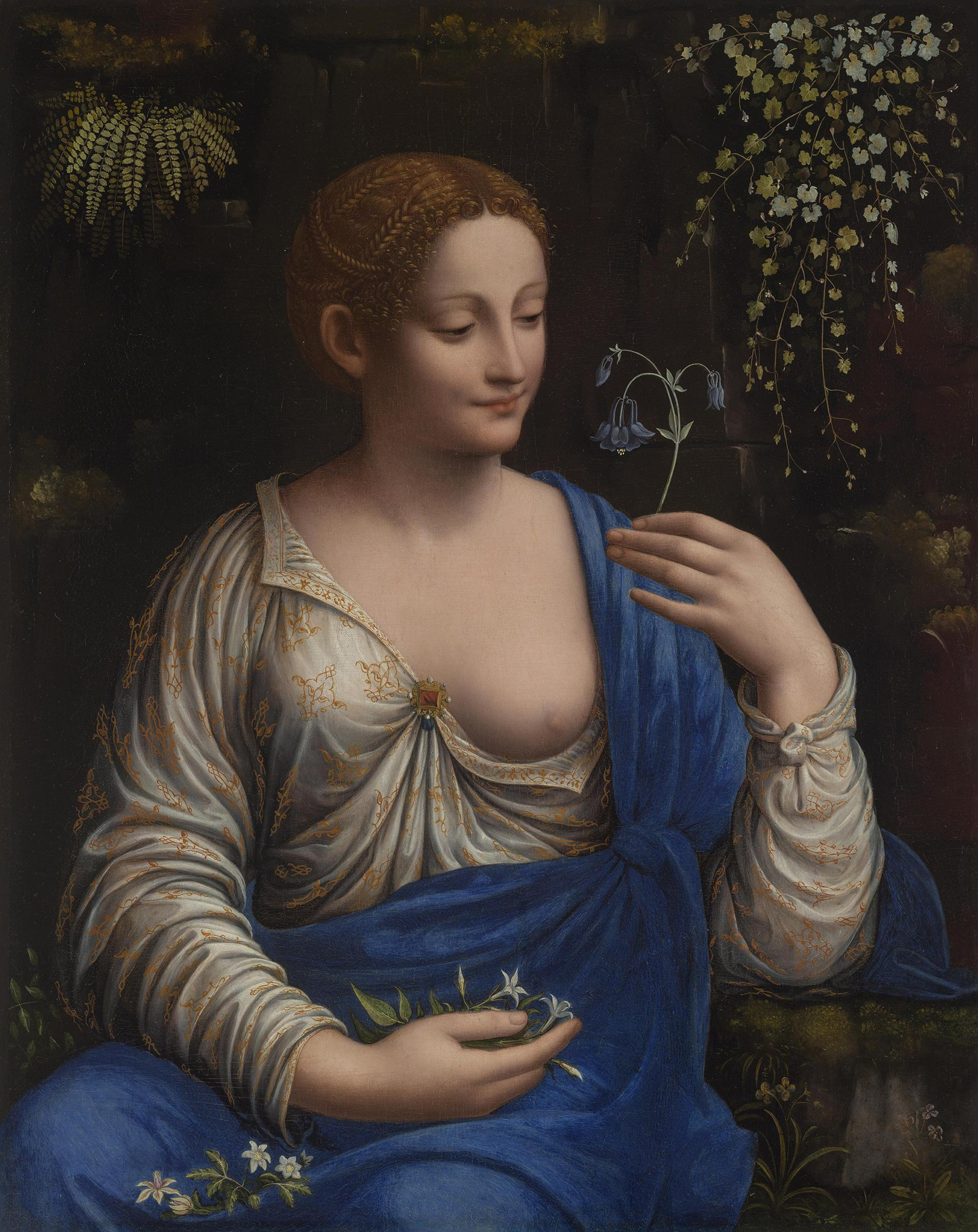
Francesco Melzi, Flora, c. 1520. Oil on panel, transferred to canvas, 76×63 cm, Hermitage Museum (ГЭ-107).

== Career and life ==
Melzi's career is inextricably linked to Leonardo da Vinci, and this could be a reason that he is not well-known, because his master overshadowed him. Sigmund Freud attributed the lack of success of Leonardo's pupils, including the talented Francesco, to their inability to distinguish themselves as separate from their master, and thus their careers were unable to flourish after his death. Before Leonardo's death in 1519, Francesco's career consisted largely of being an assistant to, and an executor for, Leonardo. Because of their close relationship, more like father-son rather than master-apprentice, he was content with aiding and caring for Leonardo, a companion/secretary. One of his main tasks was to scribe his master's Codex Trivulzianus, a manuscript of learned words and ideas, which is presumed to have been written entirely in Milan because Francesco (or Leonardo) scribed "Milan" on the last page.

Francesco was Leonardo's only pupil who stayed with him until his death, traveling and working with him in Milan, Rome, and France. He accompanied the master painter to Milan, where the French governor of Milan Charles d'Amboise was Leonardo's patron, and went to Rome with him in 1513. In his notebook Leonardo wrote, "I left Milan for Rome on the 24th day of September 1513, with Giovanni Boltraffio, Francesco de' Melzi, Lorenzo di Credi, and il Fanfoia". After three years in Rome, Francesco accompanied Leonardo to France in 1516 where they stayed in the Chateau de Cloux in Amboise. During this time, Francis I of France was Leonardo's patron, and the French court account books logged Leonardo's annual payment was 1000 gold crowns (écus de soleil), while Francesco Melzi received 400.

During this time in France, Andrea Salaí, another pupil, left Leonardo and built a house on Leonardo's estate in Italy, and so Francesco was the last pupil who continued to work for his master until his death. He was the executor and heir of Leonardo's will. Although Francesco was Leonardo's official heir and was bequeathed with his master's manuscripts, drawings, workshop materials and machinery, Salaì received Leonardo's paintings in 1524 in France and brought them back to Milan. Francesco's responsibility attaching him to Leonardo da Vinci was to care for his late master's works after he passed. Leonardo wanted his works to be shared with the world and read by others after his death, however Francesco never fully accomplished this.

=== Codex Urbinas ===
Francesco Melzi is known for creating the Codex Urbinas, which is a selection and careful compilation of Leonardo's thousands of pages of notes and sketches under the title "On Painting", and was later known as the Tratatto della Pittura [Treatise on Painting]. Once he inherited Leonardo's manuscripts, he extensively catalogued them and most likely had the intention to publish them. However, Leonardo's works were not seen for the larger part of the 16th century.

Despite not managing to publish them, Melzi's curation did in fact ensure the future preservation of his late master's works that he treasured so greatly: He gathered 944 short chapters from Leonardo's scattered notes, but had difficulty organizing and arranging the material, and even left some pages blank. Being a Milanese noble, Francesco Melzi must have employed helpers to sort through the thousands of pages of notes, but he was the only one who could decipher Leonardo's unique left-handed mirror-like writing style, and his spelling and enigmatic abbreviations. However, deciphering was just the beginning.

Before the manuscript was published, students made at least five hand-written copies from Melzi's original, some of which are currently held in the Elmer Belt Library of Vinciana at the UCLA library. Melzi loaned out these pre-publication versions of Leonardo's work to scholars of the time, such as Vasari, Lomazzo, Antonio Gaddiano, Cardano, among others; their names are inscribed on numerous surviving manuscript copies. The copies of Francesco's original manuscript were the sources that did later lead to the preparation and printing of the actual published document.

After Francesco's death c. 1570 his collection of Leonardo's papers and the manuscripts he transcribed from them were poorly cared for. The works would eventually be compiled, and published as the Codex Urbinas. In addition to caring for Leonardo's papers, Melzi actually executed and completed a number of plans for paintings, and completed paintings that were left unfinished at Leonardo's death. Francesco's son Orazio Melzi was a lawyer. Although Orazio inherited the manuscripts, he knew very little of Leonardo da Vinci, or the manuscripts his father kept, and therefore did not understand their value. So for years, the papers laid neglected and unpublished in Orazio's attic. When Orazio died, on his estate in Vaprio d'Adda, his heirs sold Francesco's collection of Leonardo's works, and thus the papers began to disperse, untraced, through art collections.

=== Legacy ===
In addition to preserving Leonardo's manuscripts, Francesco Melzi also is said to have contributed greatly towards the legacy of Leonardo in future generations. Because he owned his master's manuscripts, notes, and works, after his death, he was able to share with the next generation of artists Leonardo's genius, techniques, and oeuvre. This Leonardismo, the continued influence that Leonardo's legacy had on future painters' style and thought, continued throughout the 1500s.

For example, Francesco's pupil, Girolamo Figino, was described by the Italian scholar Francesco Albuzio in his Memorie per servire alla storia de'pittori, scultori e architect milanesi (1776) as "illuminator and disciple of Francesco Melzi". Girolamo created two paintings which are references to his predecessors; his Madonna and Saints is thought to be inspired by Melzi's Vertumnus and Pomona, and his Portrait of Margherita Colleoni references Leonardo's Mona Lisa, which is a testimony to the continuation of Leonardo's teachings after his death.

== Relationship with Leonardo da Vinci ==
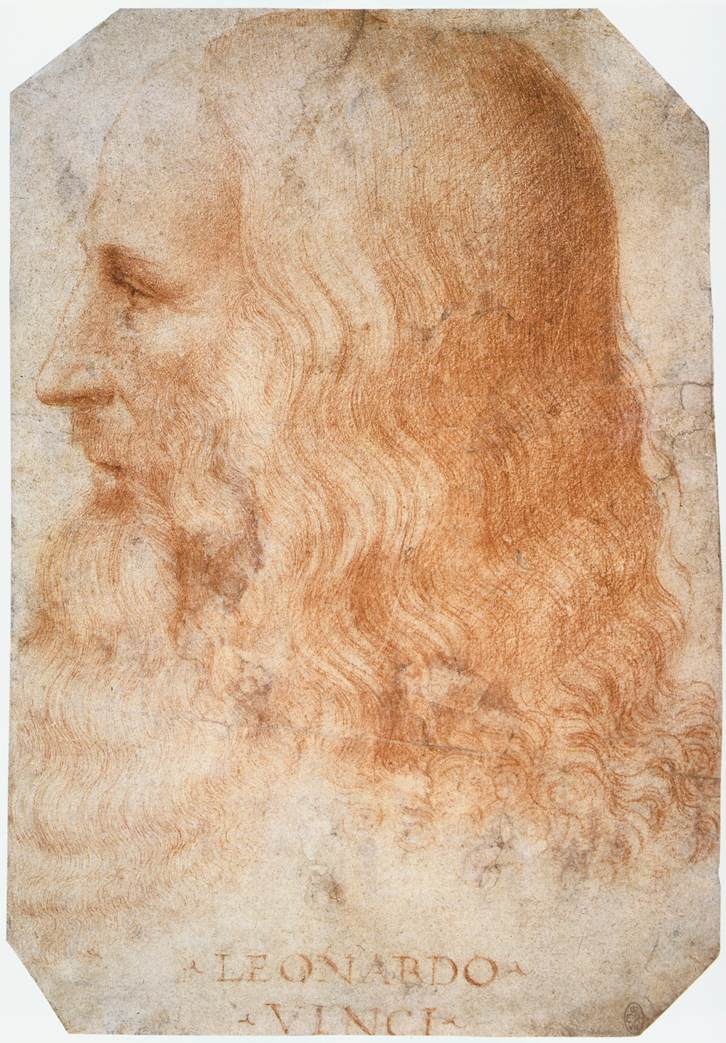
Portrait of Leonardo by Francesco Melzi

From the time Melzi became an apprentice at da Vinci's workshop, his life largely revolved around his master's. Leonardo took an immediate liking to Francesco when he met him as an adolescent at his house in Milan, and took Francesco under his wing as an apprentice. Francesco became like a son to Leonardo, and followed him up until his death in 1519. Francesco quickly became aware of his master's loneliness, seeing past his legendary fame and genius, and felt impelled to care for him, essentially devoting his whole life to him. Leonardo's second Milanese period, when he resided with the Melzi family, is by some considered his most creative years in art and canal engineering. This is the time when he created the engineering plans for the Martesana Canal, which was completed and is still in use.

Due to the closeness of Melzi's relationship with Leonardo, some theorize that it may have been romantic or sexual in nature. These theories have been debated, with some stating their relationship never extended past platonic or familial affection. However, it does seem plausible, based on Leonardo's past: There have been no accounts of Leonardo having sexual or romantic relations of any kind, and he was also accused of homosexual acts that were at the time forbidden during his apprenticeship with Verrocchio, however was acquitted.

Melzi also influenced his master's religious beliefs. As a man of science, Leonardo was not particularly religious. In Giorgio Vasari's first edition of Lives of the Artists he accused the polymath of having heretical beliefs, however in his second edition revised this statement, and states that he "earnestly resolved to learn about the doctrines of the Catholic faith and the good and holy Christian religion". Although Francesco may have overstated his master's devotion to Christianity, towards the end of his life it is true that Leonardo was a firm believer, and that his apprentice influenced him greatly – they spent much time together and Francesco was a very devoted Christian.

The only people at Leonardo's deathbed were Melzi and members of the clergy: The vicar of the church of St. Denis at Amboise, two Franciscan friars, and two priests. Because Francesco was the only person resembling family at Leonardo's deathbed, he was the one who notified Leonardo's brothers of his death. He described in his letter Leonardo's love for his pupils as "sviscerato e ardentissimo amore", ["uncontrolled and passionate love"].

== Selected works ==
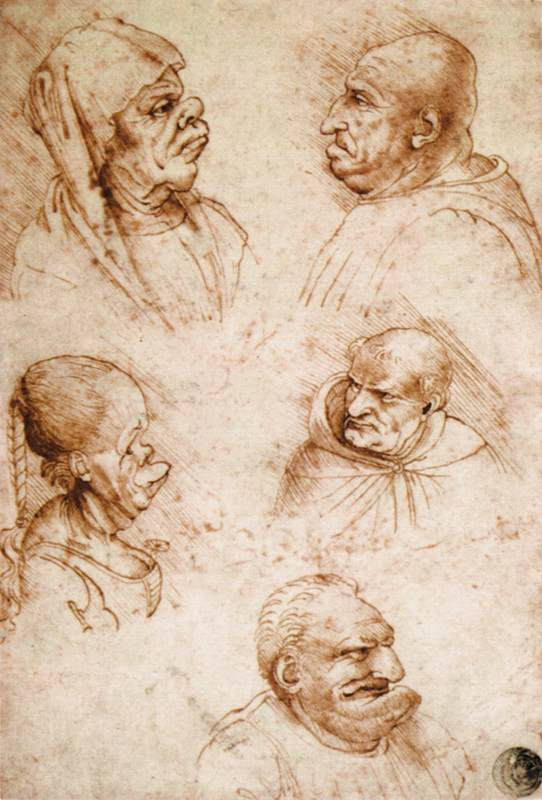
Five Grotesque Heads, by Francesco Melzi (c. 1515)

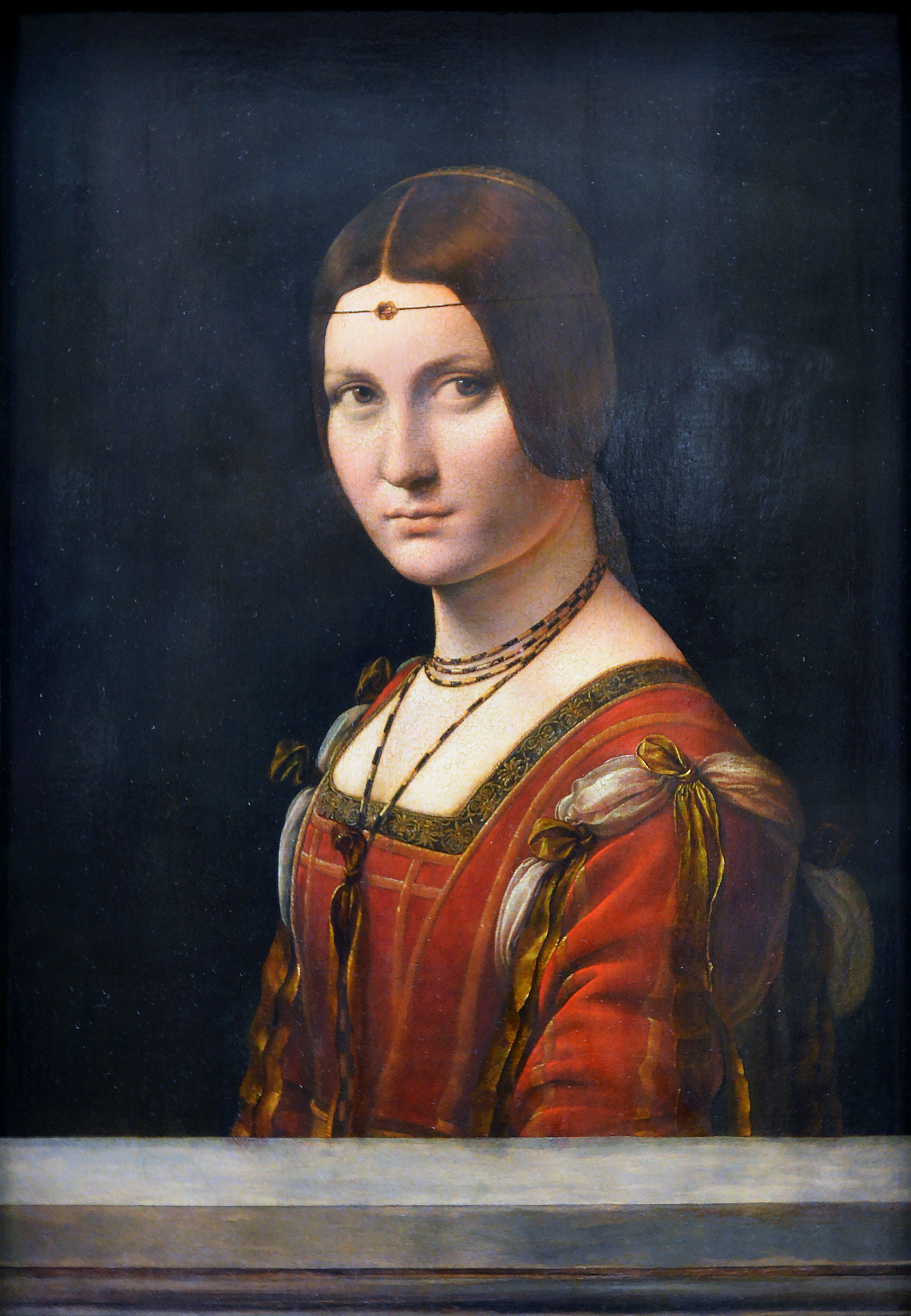
La Belle Ferronniére (1517), Louvre

Leonardo da Vinci chose only handsome boys—as was Melzi—to be his pupils and cared for them considerably as if they were family. In addition to Francesco Melzi, some of his pupils were Cesare da Sesto, Giovanni Boltraffio, and Andrea Salaì. However, as they were chosen based on attractiveness rather than talent, they were not very skilled painters, and therefore most critics consider it easy to identify paintings they worked on, based on their lower quality.

Because of the general workshop practice where multiple artists work on one painting, it has become common practice to ascribe Leonardo's pupils to his less known (or lower quality) works. These might be referenced to as paintings done by his pupils that Leonardo touched up, as opposed to the inverse. Francesco Melzi, in contrast to his peers, actually does have a handful of completed, high quality paintings attributed to him, as well as drawings and studies. He is responsible for the red chalk portrait, from approximately 1515, of da Vinci's profile which depicts him as very classically handsome and regal. This is most likely the portrait to which Vasari and Anonimo Gaddiano, as well as other later writers, refer to in describing Leonardo as having such "grace and beauty".

There are several other drawings attributed to him in the Biblioteca Ambrosiana in Milan, including Head of an Old Man which he signed himself saying "1510 a dí 14 Augusto p.a caveat de relic Franchesco de Melzo de anti 17" ["on the day 14 August taken from a relief by Francesco Melzi 17 years of age"]. There is a note on the back sheet that identifies the man in this drawing as Artus Boysi. This drawing is red chalk on paper, and although it highlights the artist's keen ability to render from observation, Francesco's note at the bottom leads us to believe that it was based on a relief, most likely by Leonardo. It is also conjectured that he uses this same head in his Vertumnus and Pomona. He also created the chalk drawing Five Grotesque Heads, in addition to Seven Caricatures and Two Grotesque Heads, all in similar style. There are many drawings attributed to Francesco, however it is often difficult to know definitively if they are his because his style is so influenced by, and therefore similar to, Leonardo's.

Melzi is also responsible for some paintings, some of which are relatively well-known. His Vertumnus and Pomona is in the Berlin Museum displayed in the altarpiece, and his Flora, which was attributed to Leonardo until the mid 19th century, hangs in the Hermitage Museum. La Belle Ferronnière is a painting of an unidentified woman whose author is not certain. In the Louvre it is attributed to Leonardo da Vinci, but is sometimes attributed to Francesco Melzi, and even other times to Leonardo's Workshop. Other paintings by or attributed to Francesco are Nymph at the Spring (Washington Gallery of Art), Portrait of a Young Man with a Parrot (Milan, private collection), and Saint Anne with the Virgin and the Child Embracing a Lamb (Galleria degli Uffizi).

Melzi's Flora appears on the cover of Mango's 2009 album Gli amori son finestre.
