= Leda and the Swan (disambiguation) =

Leda and the Swan is a classical myth.

Leda and the Swan may also refer to:

- Leda and the Swan (Copenhagen), statue
- Leda and the Swan (Correggio), an oil on canvas painting by Correggio
- Leda and the Swan (Galleria Borghese)
- Leda and the Swan (Leonardo), lost painting
- Leda and the Swan (Michelangelo), a lost tempera on canvas painting by Michelangelo
- Leda and the Swan (Peter Paul Rubens), a painting surviving in two versions
- Leda and the Swan (Tintoretto)
- Leda and the Swan (Uffizi)
- Leda and the Swan (Wilton House), painting by Cesare da Sesto

== See also ==
- Leda (disambiguation)
- Leda Atomica, a painting by Salvador Dalí
