= Leda =

Leda may refer to:

== Mythology ==
- Leda (mythology), queen of Sparta and mother of Helen of Troy in Greek mythology

== Places ==
- Leda, Western Australia, a suburb of Perth, Western Australia
- Leda makeshift settlement, Bangladesh, a refugee camp for Rohingya refugees fleeing persecution in Myanmar
- Leda, Burkina Faso, a town
- Leda, Adamawa State, Nigeria, a village - see List of villages in Adamawa State
- Leda (river), a tributary of the Ems in Germany
- Leda Ridge, Antarctica

== Astronomy ==
- Leda (moon), a moon of Jupiter
- 38 Leda, an asteroid
- Leda, the original proposed name for exoplanet Thestias
- Lyon-Meudon Extragalactic Database, an astronomical catalog of galaxies
- Large Aperture Experiment to Detect the Dark Ages, a radio interferometer

== Entertainment ==
- Leda: The Fantastic Adventure of Yohko, a 1985 Japanese OVA
- Web of Passion, a French film released in the US as Leda
- Project Leda, a set of female clones in the TV series Orphan Black
- Leda, a protagonist from the video game Fire Emblem: Fortune's Weave

== Ships ==
- Leda-class frigate, a type of frigate in the British Royal Navy
- HMS Leda, six ships of the British Royal Navy
- TS Leda, a North Sea ferry
- Leda (1807 ship), an English merchant ship and West Indiaman

== Persons ==
- Leda Cosmides (born 1957), American psychologist
- Leda Gloria (1912–1997), Italian film actress
- Leda Luss Luyken (born 1952), Greek/American conceptual artist, who lives and works in Germany
- Leda Mileva (1920–2013), Bulgarian writer, translator and diplomat
- Leda Nagle (born 1951), Brazilian journalist and TV presenter
- Leda Sanford (born 1933), author, speaker, former publisher and former advertising director
- Ferdinando Leda (born 1980), Brazilian football player

== Other uses ==
- Leda clay, also called quick clay, a unique form of marine clay
- LEDA, ICAO code for Lleida–Alguaire Airport
- Library of Efficient Data types and Algorithms (LEDA)
- Leda, genus of Algae

== See also ==
- Leda and the Swan (disambiguation)
