= Leda and the Swan (Galleria Borghese) =

Painting after Leonardo da Vinci

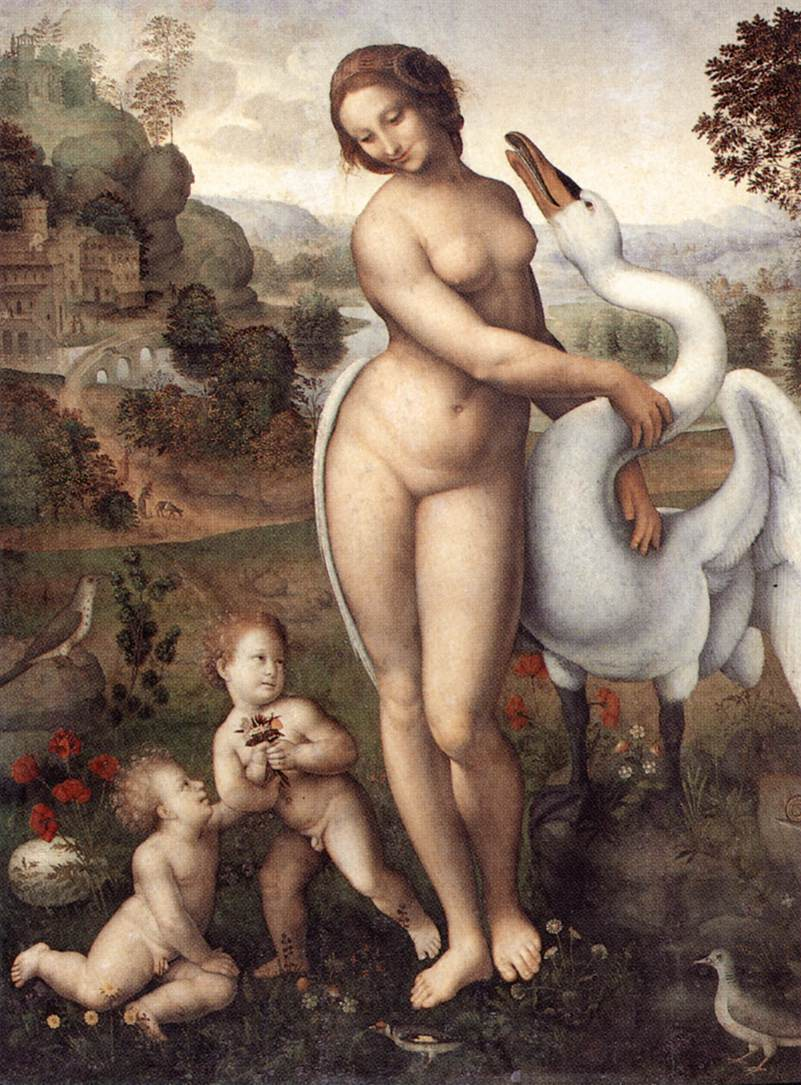
Leda and the Swan (c. 1510-1520)

Leda and the Swan is a tempera grassa on panel painting by an artist from the circle of Leonardo da Vinci, probably Cesare da Sesto. It dates to c. 1510-1520 and is now in the Galleria Borghese in Rome. It and other versions at Wilton House and the Uffizi are considered the three best copies after Leonardo's own lost Leda and the Swan.

== See also ==
- Leda and the Swan by Leonardo da Vinci
