= Leda and the Swan (Wilton House) =

Painting by Cesare da Sesto after Leonardo da Vinci

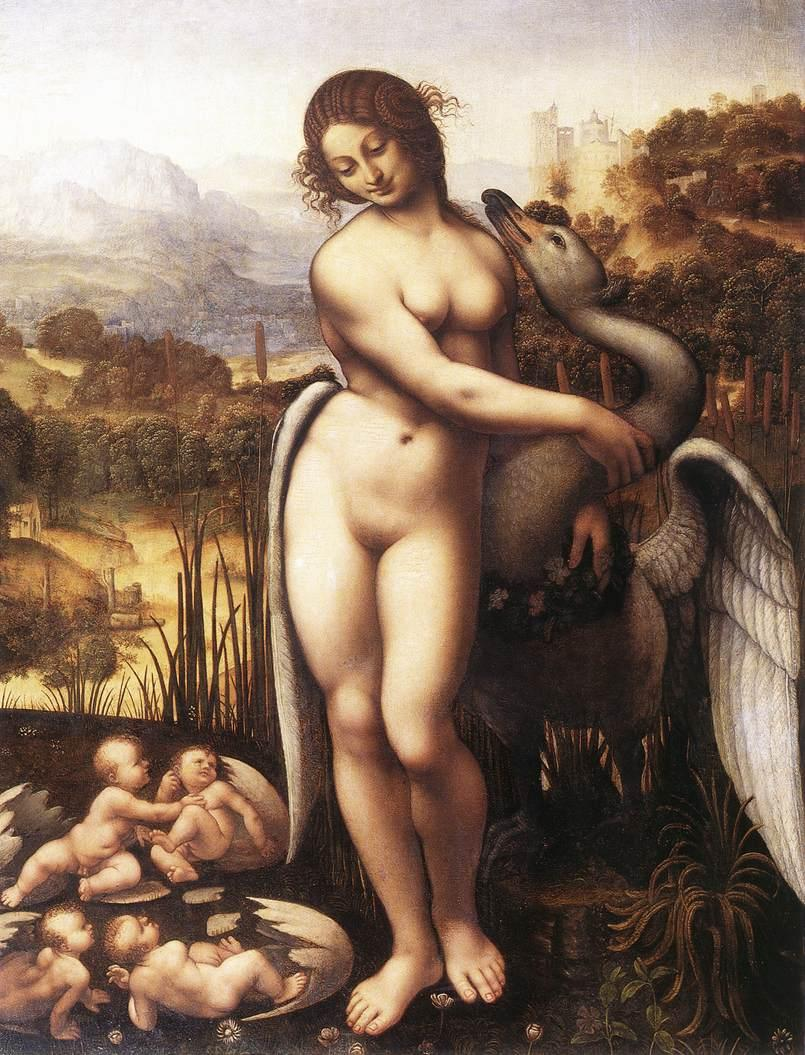

Leda and the Swan is a c.1515 painting by Cesare da Sesto, a painter in the circle of Leonardo da Vinci. It is now in Wilton House near Salisbury, UK. With other versions now at the Galleria Borghese (probably also by Cesare) and Uffizi, it is thought to be one of three of the closest copies after Leonardo's own lost work on the subject.
