= Leda and the Swan (Uffizi) =

Painting after Leonardo da Vinci

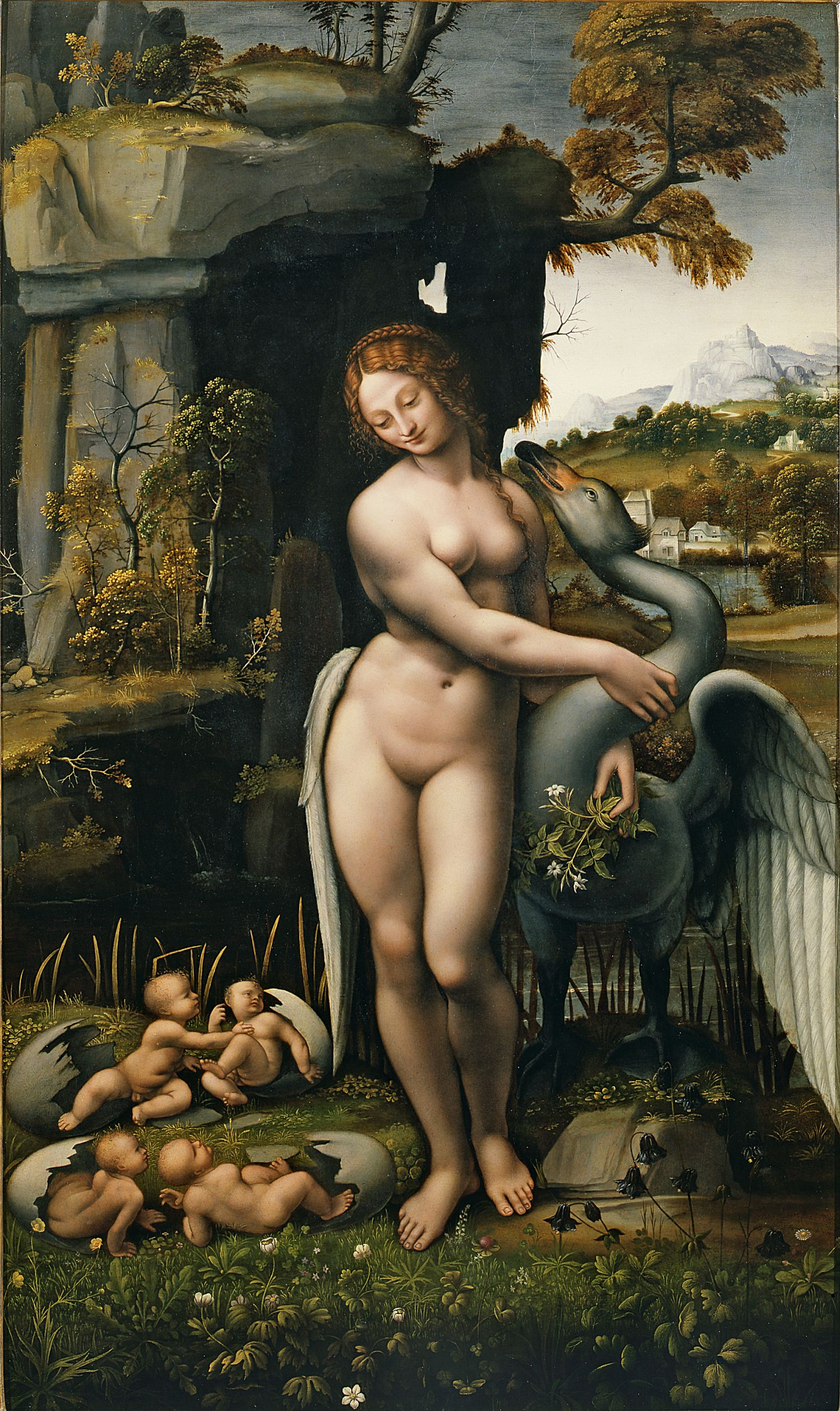

Leda and the Swan is a c.1505-1507 oil and resin on panel painting by a painter in the circle of Leonardo da Vinci. It may have originated in the Gualtieri Collection in L'Aquila and passed through various others before being acquired from the Spiridon Collection in 1989 by its present owner, the Uffizi.

It and the versions in the Galleria Borghese and Wilton House are considered the three closest copies after Leonardo's own lost work on the same subject. Bernard Berenson even argued the Uffizi work was an autograph work by Leonardo himself, but this is rejected by modern art historians in favour of one of Leonardo's students, possibly Francesco Melzi with some assistance on the landscape background from Joos van Cleve. It is usually dated to the end of Melzi's stay in Milan before leaving for France with Leonardo. Other suggestions include Cesare da Sesto or Fernando Yáñez de la Almedina - the latter assisted Leonardo in 1505 on The Battle of Anghiari.
