= Adoration of the Magi (Cesare da Sesto) =

Painting by Cesare da Sesto

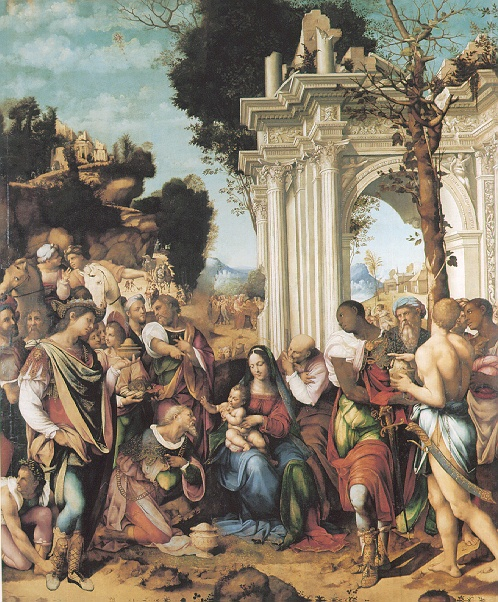
- Artist: Cesare da Sesto
- Year: c. 1516-1519
- Medium: Oil on
- Dimensions: 165 cm cm × 195 cm cm ( ×)
- Location: National Museum of Capodimonte, Naples, Italy

Adoration of the Magi is a c.1516-1519 painting by Cesare da Sesto, produced during his stay in Messina. It was commissioned by the Congrega di San Niccolò dei Gentiluomini as the high altarpiece for that church. After the church was suppressed at the end of the 18th century, it joined the Bourbon collections and was taken to Naples, where it was displayed in the Quadreria of the Palazzo di Capodimonte and later the Real Museo in the former Palazzo degli Studi. It is now in the National Museum of Capodimonte in Naples.

== Sources ==
- Caio Domenico Gallo, "Annali della citta di Messina ... dal giorno di sua fondazione sino a tempi presenti" [1], Tomo I, Messina, Francesco Gaipa, 1756, p225
- Giuseppe Fiumara, "Guida per la città di Messina" [2], Messina, 1841, p23
- Pierluigi De Vecchi ed Elda Cerchiari, I tempi dell'arte, volume 2, Bompiani, Milano 1999. ISBN 88-451-7212-0
