= Leda and the Swan (Rubens) =

Two paintings by Peter Paul Rubens

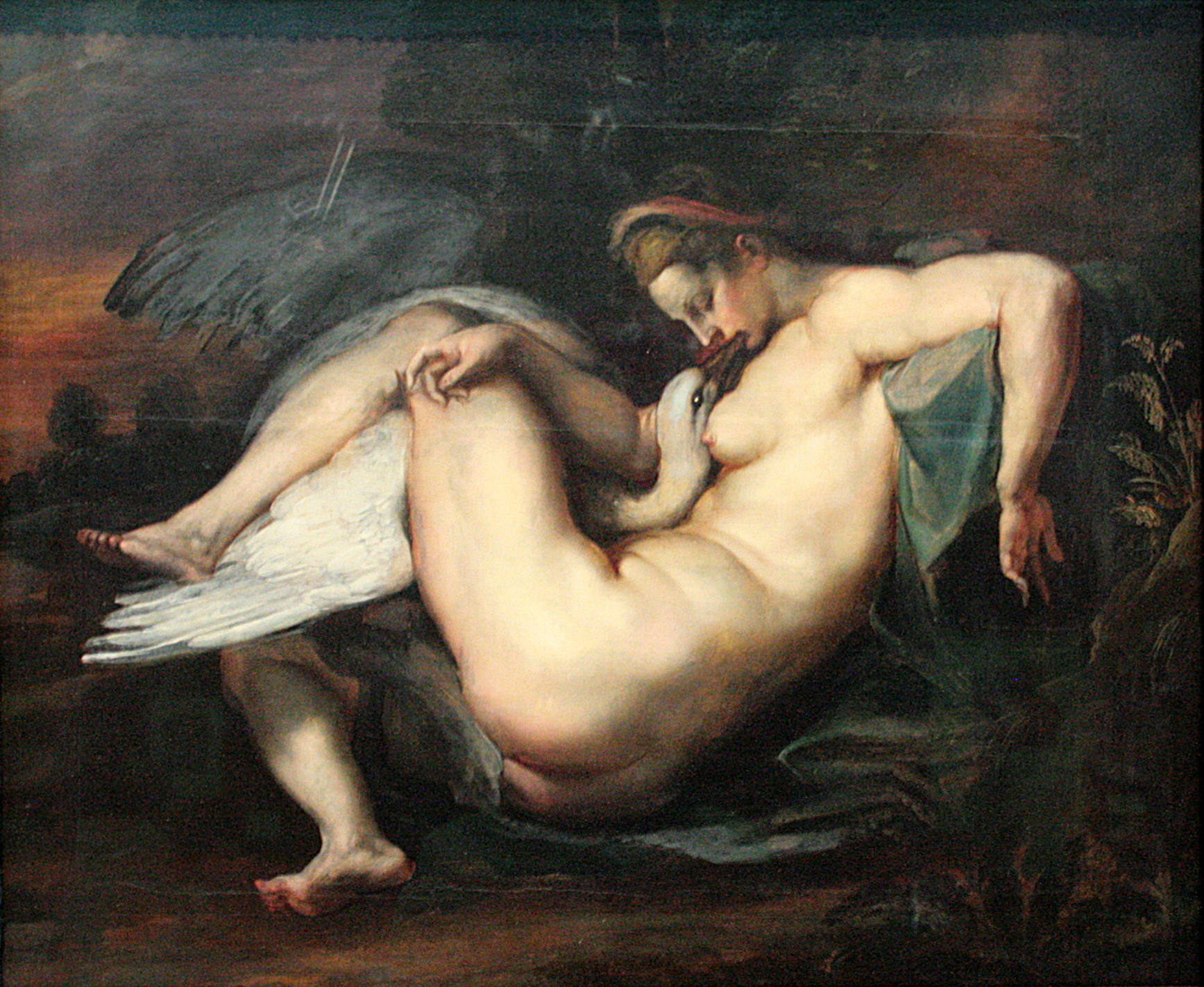
Leda and the Swan - version 1

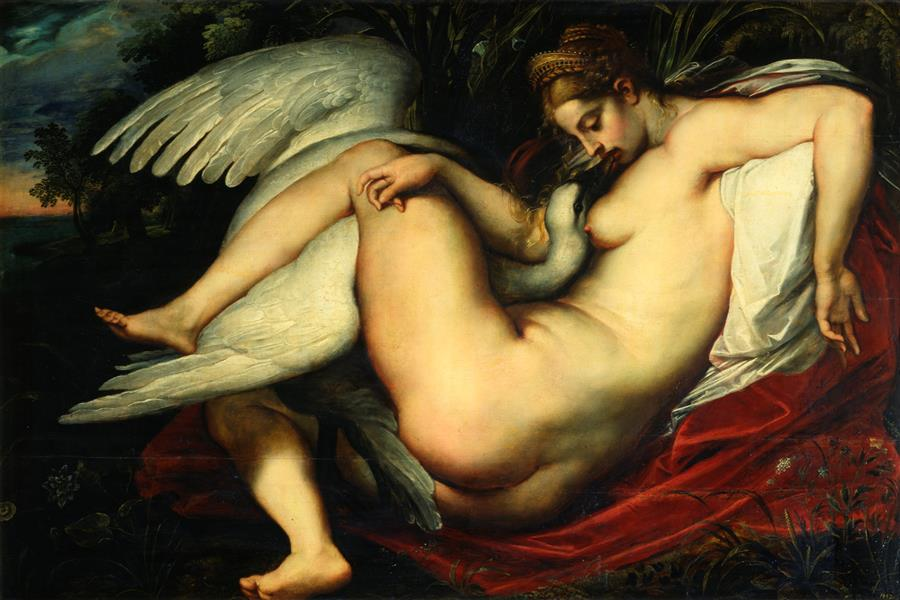
Leda and the Swan - version 2 (Gemäldegalerie Alte Meister)

Leda and the Swan is an oil painting by Peter Paul Rubens, who painted two versions of this subject. The first was completed in 1601 and the second in 1602.

Rubens was heavily influenced by Michelangelo, and both paintings are variations on Michelangelo's famous lost painting, which is known from copies and prints. He was introduced to his work on his journey to Italy. Rubens decided to go to Rome to make copies of paintings and further his studies of Italian art from the leading Italian Renaissance painters of the previous century. In Rome, he encountered Michelangelo's version of Leda and the Swan. A copy of Michelangelo's original work was done by Rubens. Rubens would have been familiar with Michelangelo's Leda. His version is considered a prototype for Rubens's two works. Rubens's 1601 Leda, was modeled after Michelangelo's Leda. The placement of the body is very similar as is its twisting posture. Even the positioning of the fingers is mirrored. The swan is caressing the female in exactly the same way.

The actual figure of the female varies drastically between Rubens's style and Michelangelo's style. Michelangelo typically depicted women in a masculine way. Muscles are more clearly defined and the bodies look hard. The body is thinner. The hair is neatly styled. Michelangelo's body proportions are a little skewed. Rubens's women, on the other hand, are extremely curvaceous and are much softer. The hair is somewhat loose and not as styled. The body proportions seem more realistic in Rubens's two works.

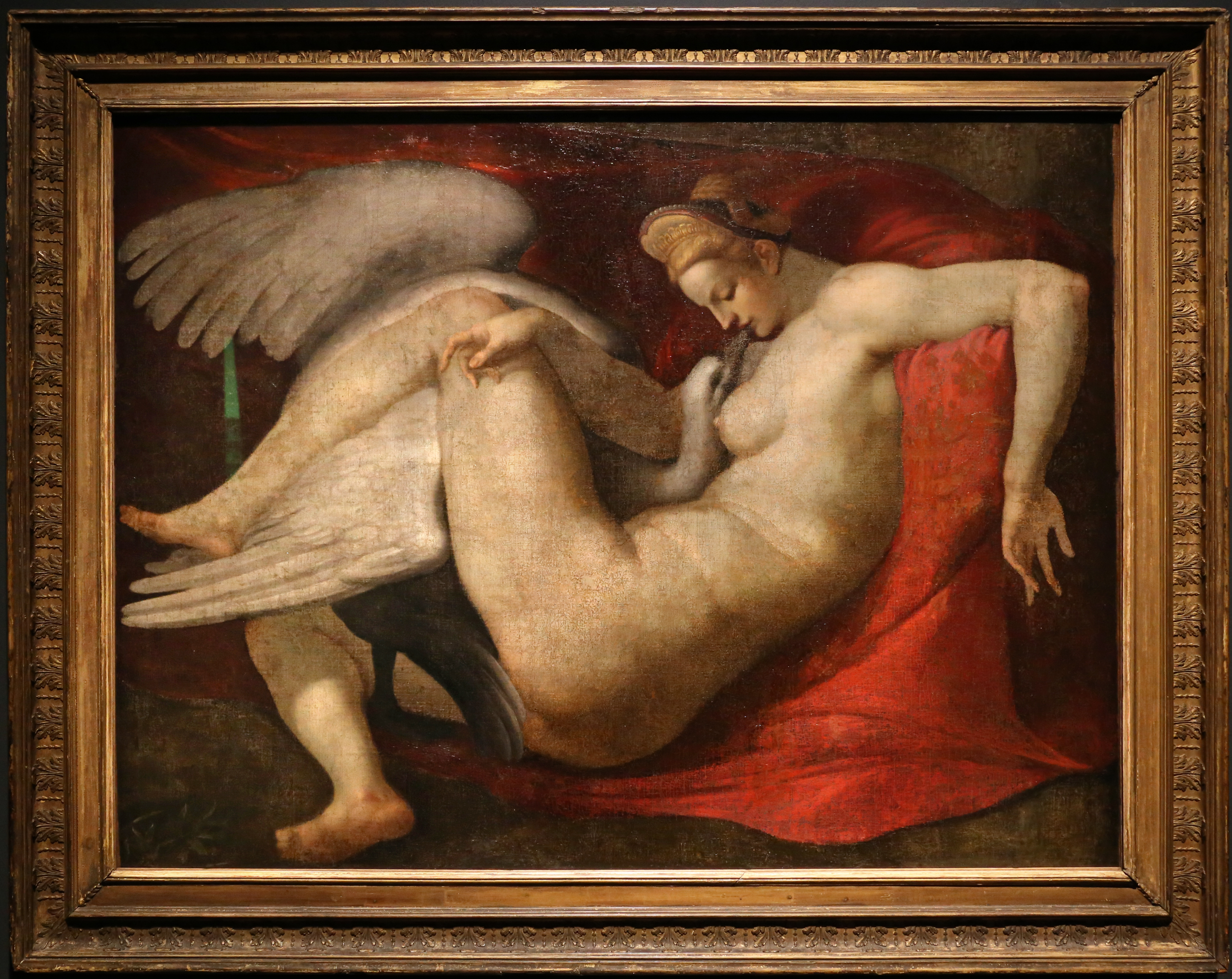
Leda and the Swan, a 16th-century copy after a lost painting by Michelangelo (National Gallery, London)

Though Rubens's two works are very similar, they do differ. In his first depiction, the brushstrokes are looser, it is not as detailed, there is less landscape, no elaborate headpiece, the colors are muted, and the drapes are green. The 1601 painting was initially supposed to be in a painted ellipse that cut off the left elbow and part of the right foot as seen through x-rays. Today it is in a rectangular format along with the 1602 painting. In his second painting, the brushstrokes are more precise, there is more detail, there is a clearer landscape in the background, an elaborate headpiece, more vibrant colors, and the drapery is white and red.

A common Renaissance and Baroque theme is females that are abducted or seduced by divinities. This includes Leda and the swan as Zeus, as well as Europa, Antiope, and Danae. Many portrayals of women being seduced by divinities are shown in a sensual manner. For instance, Rubens's Leda, is very erotic. Leda is shown fully nude with her buttocks and left breast being visible. The swan is caressing her on her most intimate area with its neck cradled between her breasts. The swan is depicted as a graceful animal who also can ravish.

There are many variations to the myth of Leda and the swan. Leda is sometimes called Nemesis and other times they are two separate people. Leda was married to the king of Sparta, Tyndareus. She is the mother of several children though she is most known for giving birth to Clytemnestra, Helen, Pollux, and Castor. The most common myth claims that Zeus transformed himself into a swan to couple with Leda. Some versions claim that she loved Zeus and willing had sexual relations with him, while other versions claim she was seduced and therefore was not willing. That same night, she coupled with Tyndareus also. Leda then gave birth to four children at the same time. The two pairs of twins resulted in Helen and Pollux belonging to Zeus, and Clytemnestra and Castor belonging to Tyndareus. Though each pair is attributed to either Zeus or Tyndareus, each man is said to be the father of all four children. Castor and Pollux were called the Dioscuri meaning "Zeus's sons", even though Castor was mortal because he was the son of Tyndareus and Pollux was immortal because he was the son of Zeus.

According to Hermes in Lucians' The Dialogues of the Dead, Leda and her daughter (Helen of Troy) are the only women worthy of the title "beauties of old". Rubens's depictions of Leda's curvy figure, alabaster skin, and golden hair represent a type of "Rubenesque" female figure he became famous for.
