= Leda (1807 ship) =

History

United Kingdom
- Name: Leda
- Builder: Holt & Richardson, Whitby
- Launched: 1807
- Fate: Wrecked 1819

General characteristics
- Tons burthen: 399, or 408 (bm)
- Length: 108 ft 9 in (33.1 m)
- Beam: 29 ft 5 in (9.0 m)

Leda was launched in 1807 at Whitby. She spent most of her career as a London transport, and then a West Indiaman. She was wrecked in May 1819 on a voyage to Bombay while sailing under a license from the British East India Company (EIC).

== Career ==
Leda first appeared in Lloyd's Register (LR) in 1808 with Wilmot, master, Richardson, owner, and trade London transport.

Year	Master	Owner	Trade	Source & notes
1816	Wilmot; L.Lucy	Richardson	London transport London–Jamaica	LR; thorough repair 1815
1818	L.Lacey	Richardson	London–Jamaica	LR; thorough repair 1815
1819	L.Lacey; Lamb	Richardson	London–Jamaica	LR; thorough repair 1815
1820	G.Lamb	Richardson	Liverpool–Bombay	LR; thorough repair 1815

In 1813 the EIC lost its monopoly on the trade between India and Britain. British ships were then free to sail to India or the Indian Ocean under a license from the EIC. In January 1819 Leda, G.Lamb, master, sailed for Bombay.

== Fate ==
Leda, Lamb, master, arrived at Madeira on 17 February 1819 and sailed for Bombay. She ran aground on a shoal 9 nautical miles (17 km) south west of Mayotte on 14 May 1819. She was wrecked but her crew were rescued. They arrived at Bombay on 24 June.
