= HMS Leda =

HMS Leda may refer to one of the following ships of the British Royal Navy named after the Leda of Greek mythology:

- HMS Leda (1783), a 36-gun fifth rate launched in 1783 and foundered 1795
- HMS Leda (1800), a 38-gun fifth rate launched 1800 and wrecked 1808
- HMS Leda (1809), a 36-gun fifth rate launched 1809 and sold 1817
- HMS Leda (1828), a 46-gun fifth rate launched in 1828, used as a police hulk from 1864, and sold in 1906
- HMS Leda (1892), a torpedo gunboat launched in 1892, converted to a minesweeper 1909 and sold 1920
- HMS Leda (J93), launched in 1937, was a Halcyon-class minesweeper sunk by U-435 on 20 September 1942
