= Cesare da Sesto =

Italian painter (1477–1523)

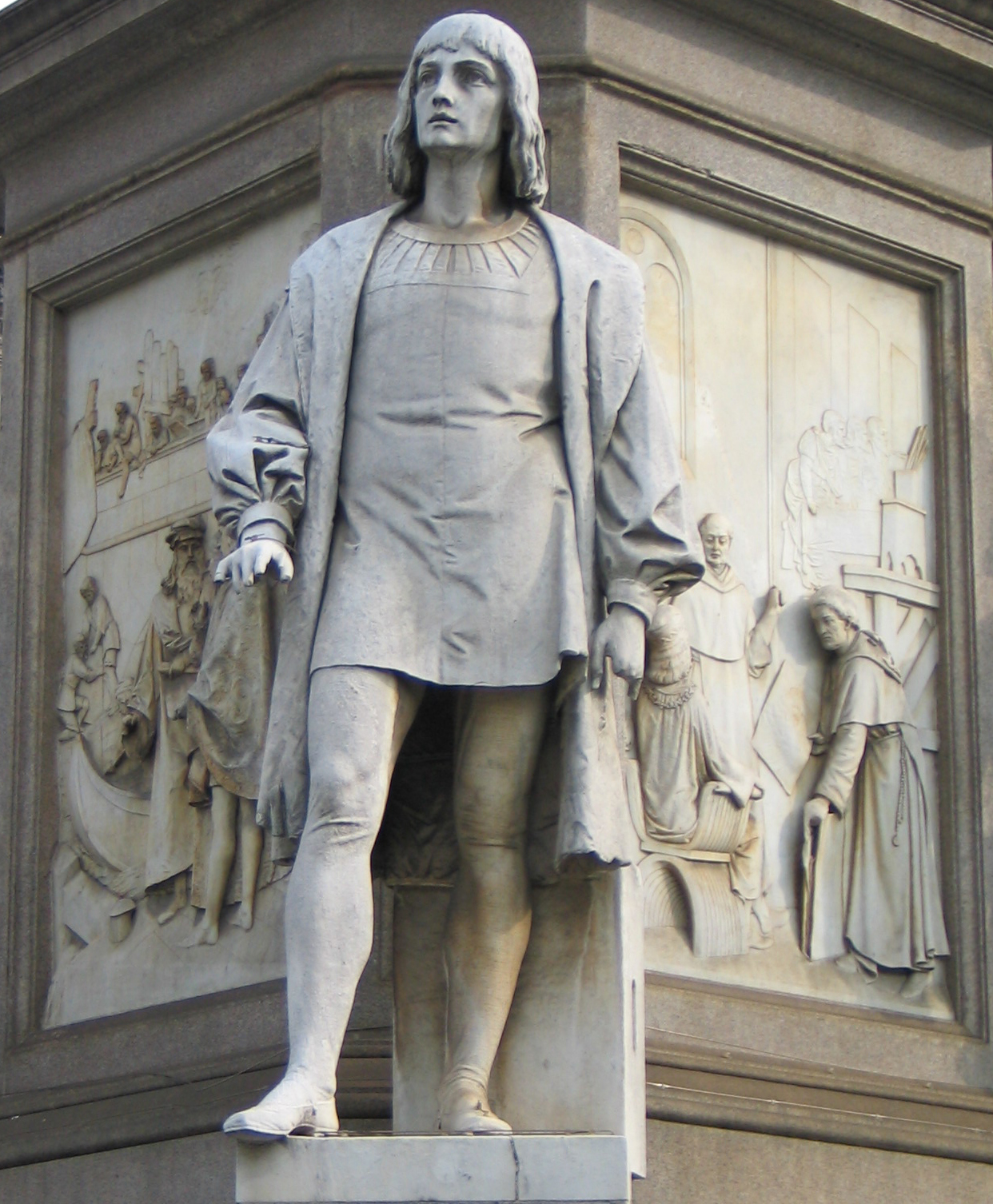
Statue of Cesare da Sesto, Leonardo Monument, Milan.

Cesare da Sesto (1477–1523) was an Italian painter of the Renaissance active in Milan and elsewhere in Italy.

== Life ==
Cesare da Sesto was born in Sesto Calende, Lombardy. He is considered one of the Leonardeschi or artists influenced by Leonardo da Vinci, such as Bernardino Luini and Marco d'Oggiono. He may have trained or worked with Baldassare Peruzzi in Rome in 1505. Of this period, a lunette in Sant'Onofrio and some paintings in Campagnano Romano are attributed to him.

From 1514 he sojourned in Naples for six years. In 1515 he finished a monumental polyptych for the La Trinità della Cava at Cava de' Tirreni and produced Leda and the Swan, a copy after Leonardo's own work on the subject. Back in Milan, he executed a Baptism of Christ, in collaboration with Bernardino Bernazzano (Collezione Gallarati Scotti, Milan) and a Salomè, acquired by Rudolf II and now at the Kunsthistorisches Museum of Vienna. In 1517 he returned to southern Italy. Sometime between 1516 and 1519 in Messina, he completed his Adoration of the Magi, which influenced numerous artists of southern Italy, it can be found in the Musei di Capodimonte of Naples.

He returned to Milan in 1520, where he painted the Madonna in Glory with Saints polyptych for the church of San Rocco (now in the Castello Sforzesco). He died in Milan in 1523.

== Gallery ==
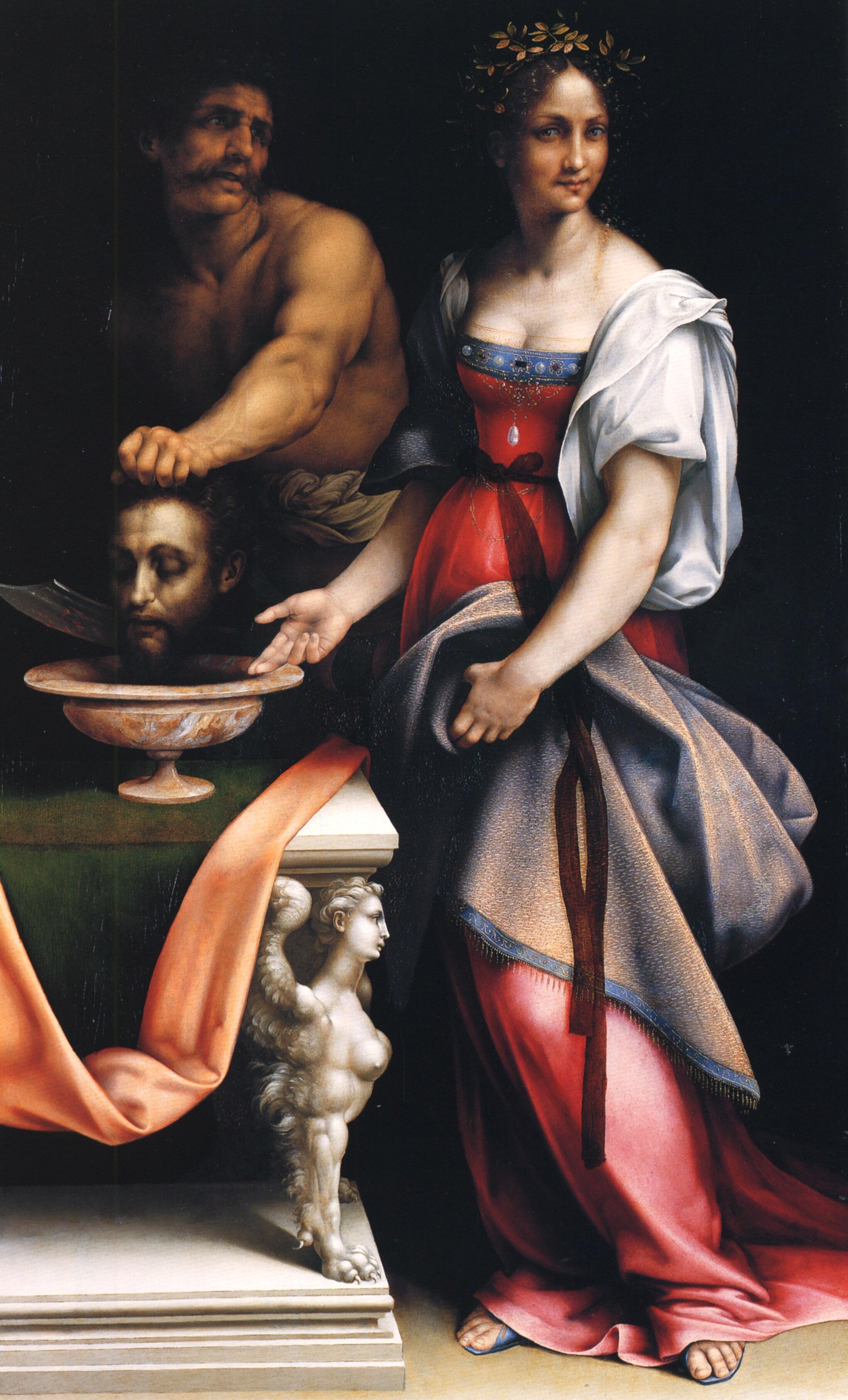
Salome (c. 1510–20)

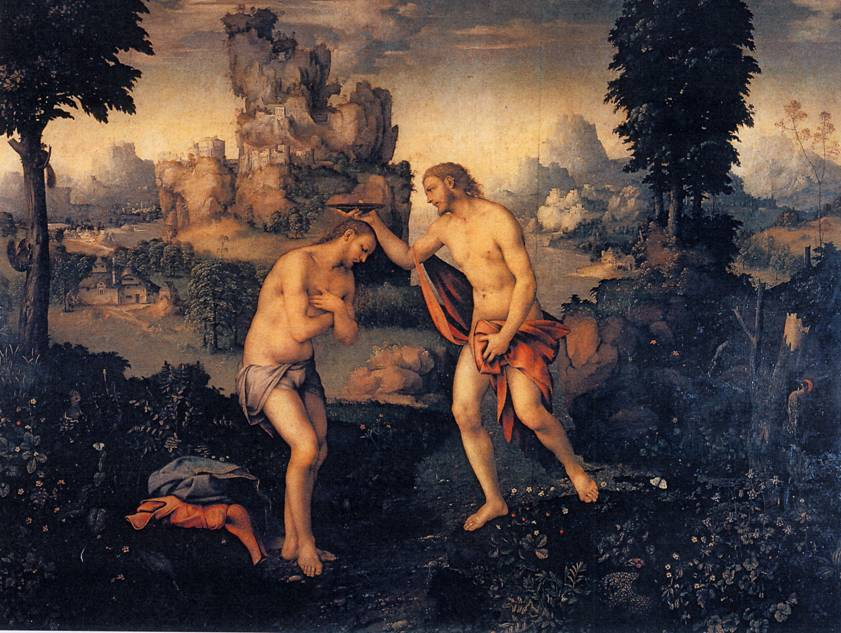
Baptism of Christ (c. 1512–14)

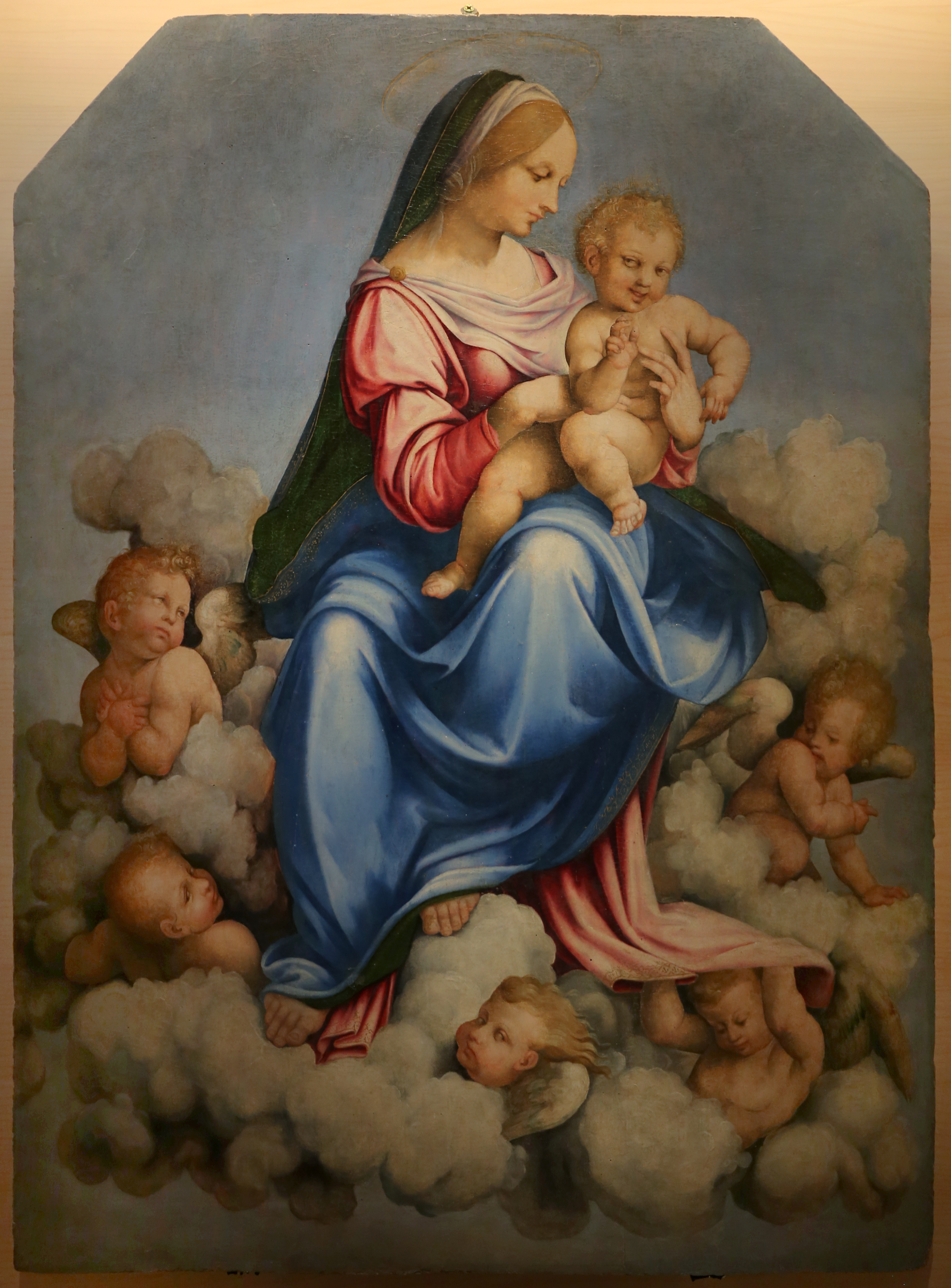
Madonna and Child with Angels (c. 1514-15)

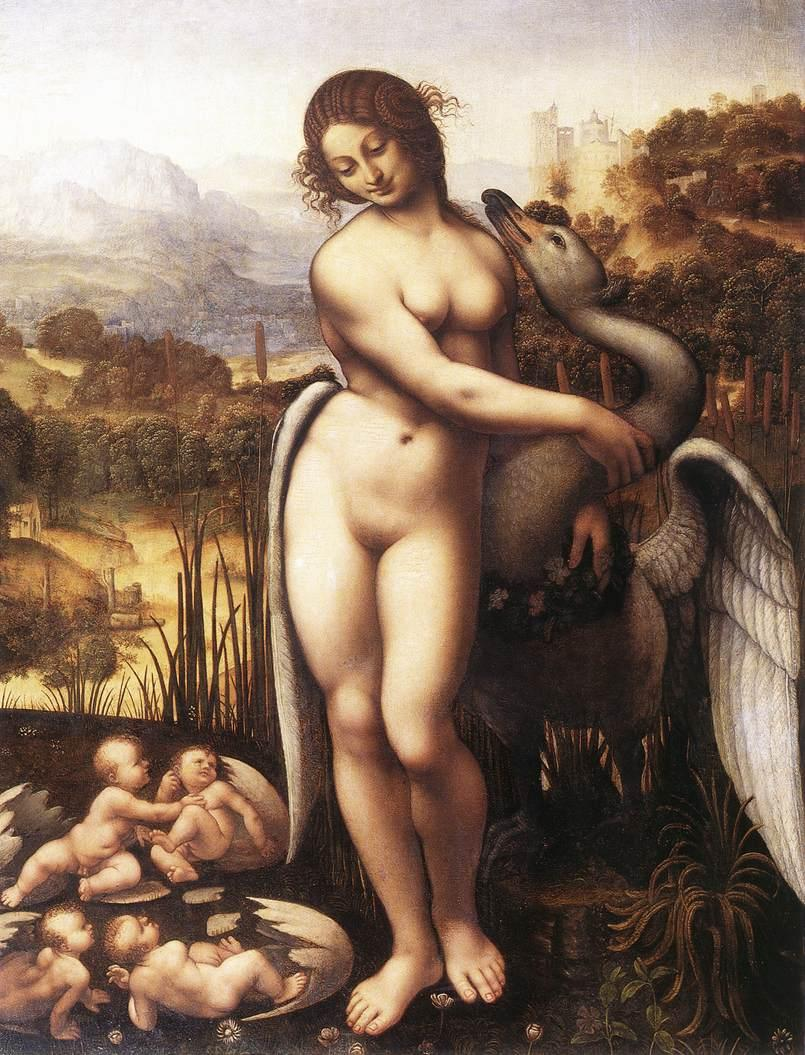
Leda and the Swan (c. 1515)

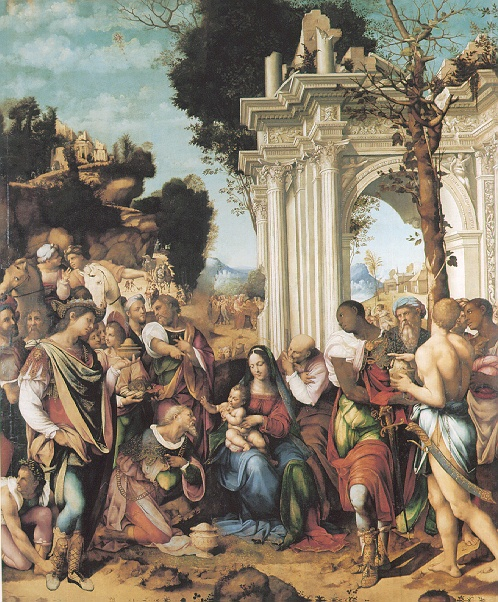
Adoration of the Magi (c. 1516–19)

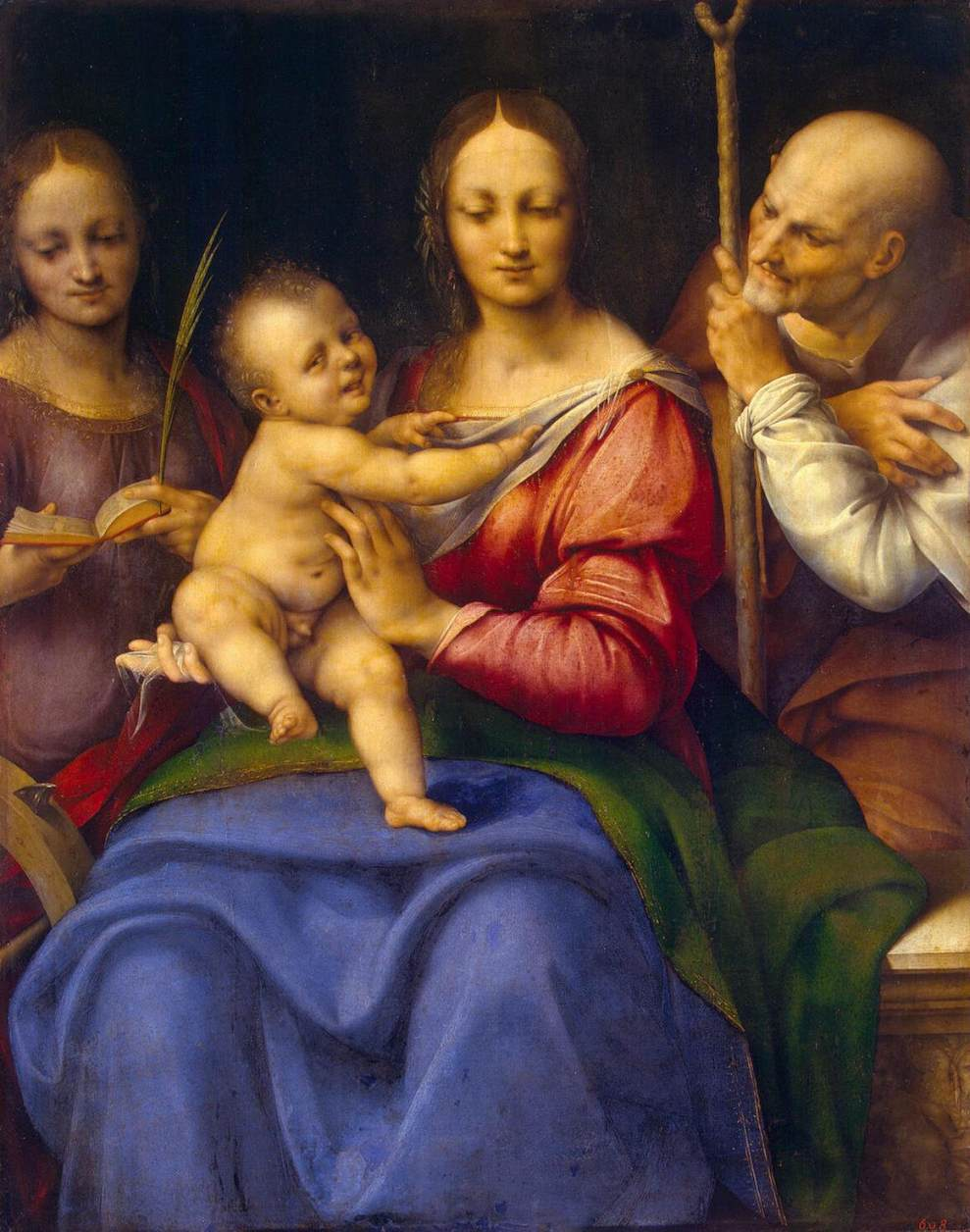
Holy Family with St Catherine (c. 1515–20), now in Hermitage Museum

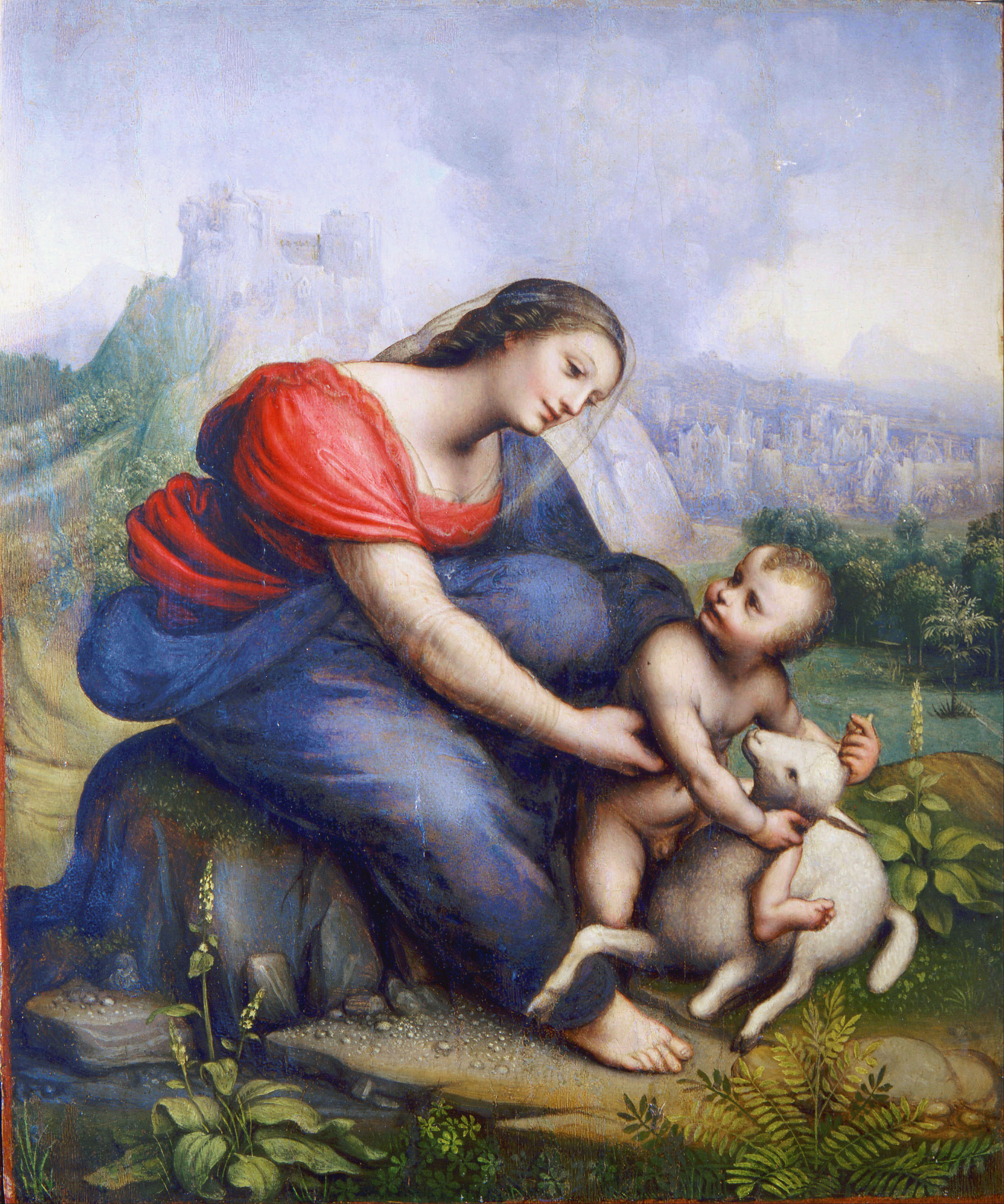
The Virgin and Child with a Lamb (c. 1520), after da Vinci's The Virgin and Child with Saint Anne. Now in Museo Poldi Pezzoli, Milan

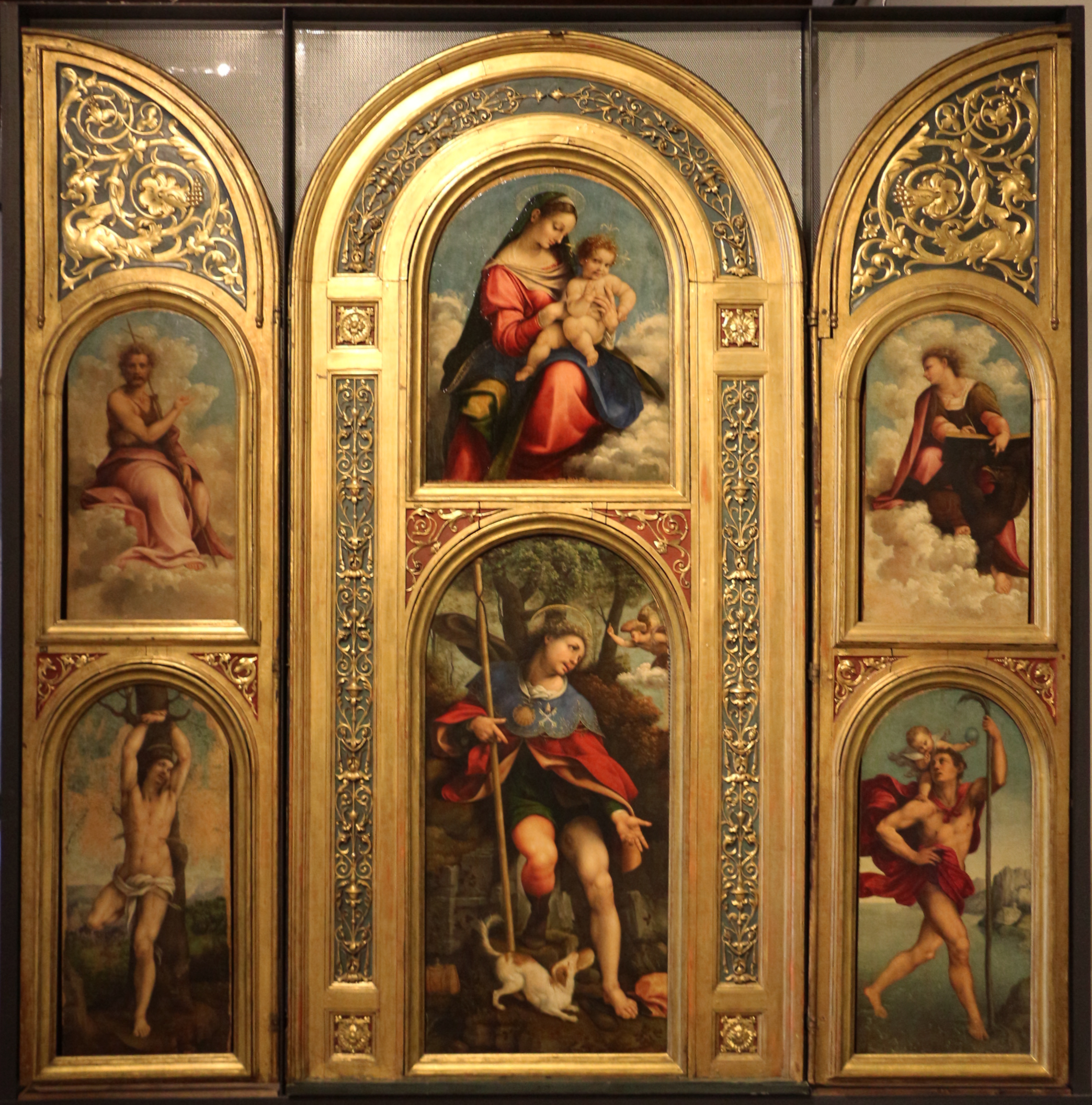
Polyptych of San Rocco (c. 1523)

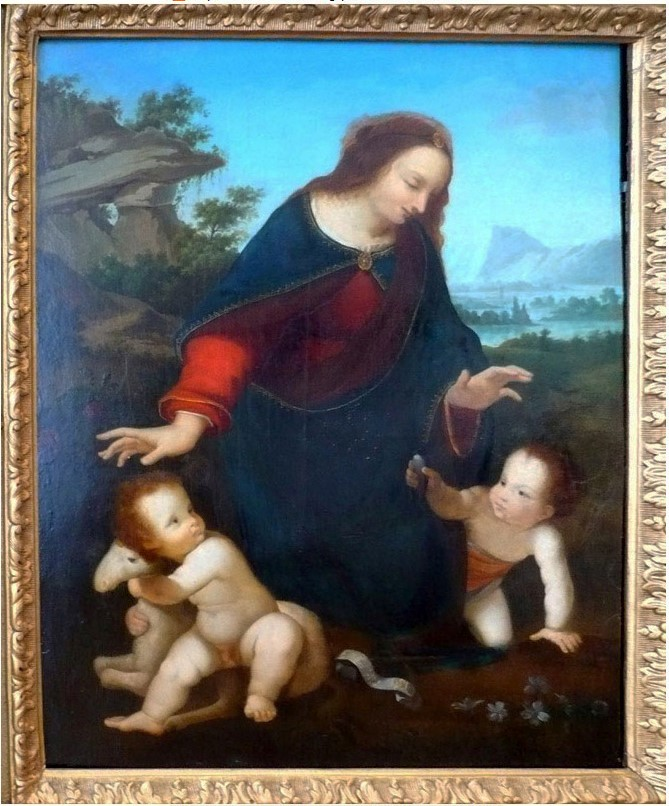
The Madonna and Child with the Infant Saint John the Baptist, Musée du château de Flers (Orne)

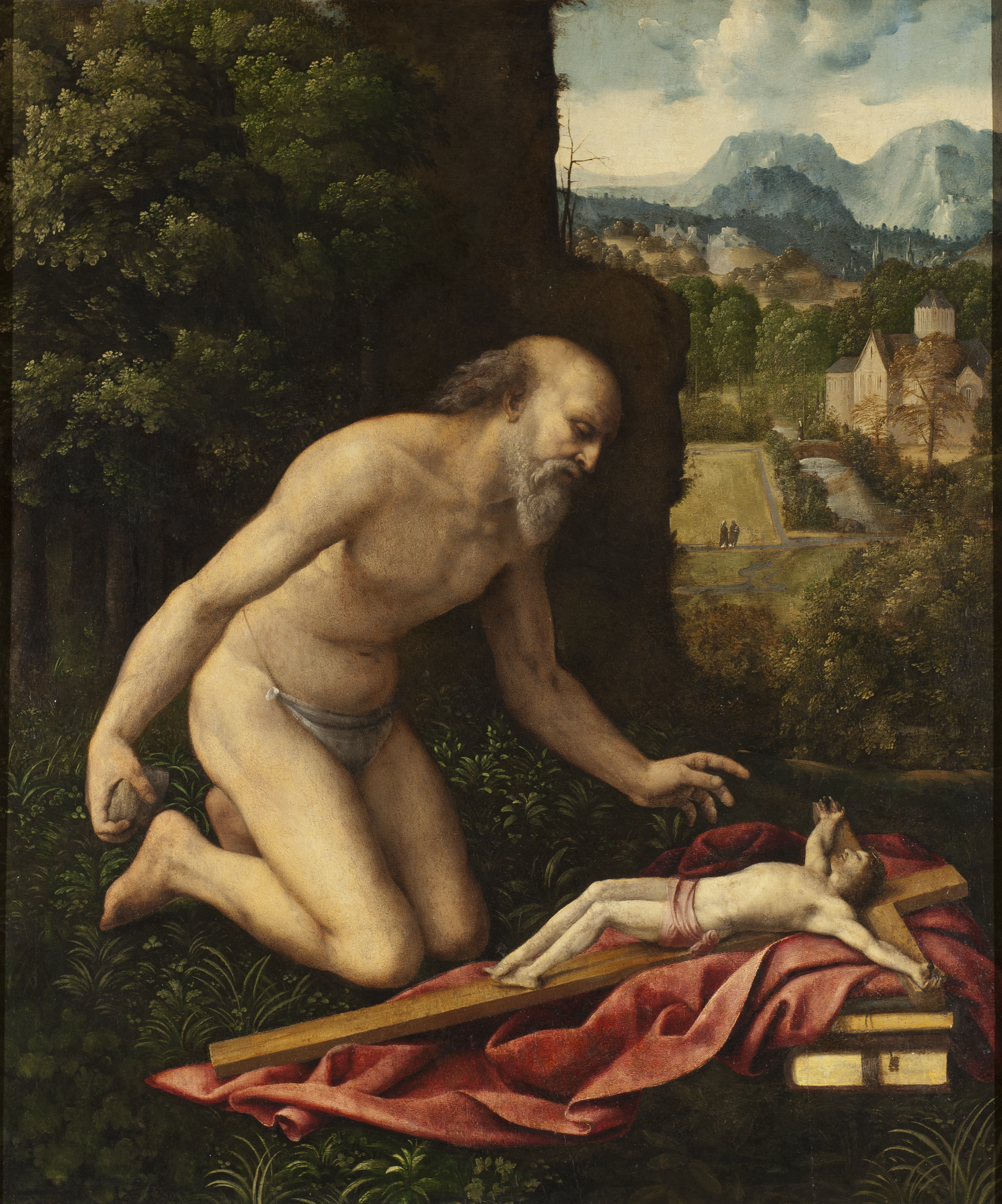
Saint Jerome, now in Nationalmuseum

== Sources ==
- Freedberg, Sydney J. (1993). Pelican History of Art; Painting in Italy, 1500–1600. Penguin Books. pp. 383–4.
