= Leda and the Swan (Leonardo) =

Lost paintings by Leonardo da Vinci

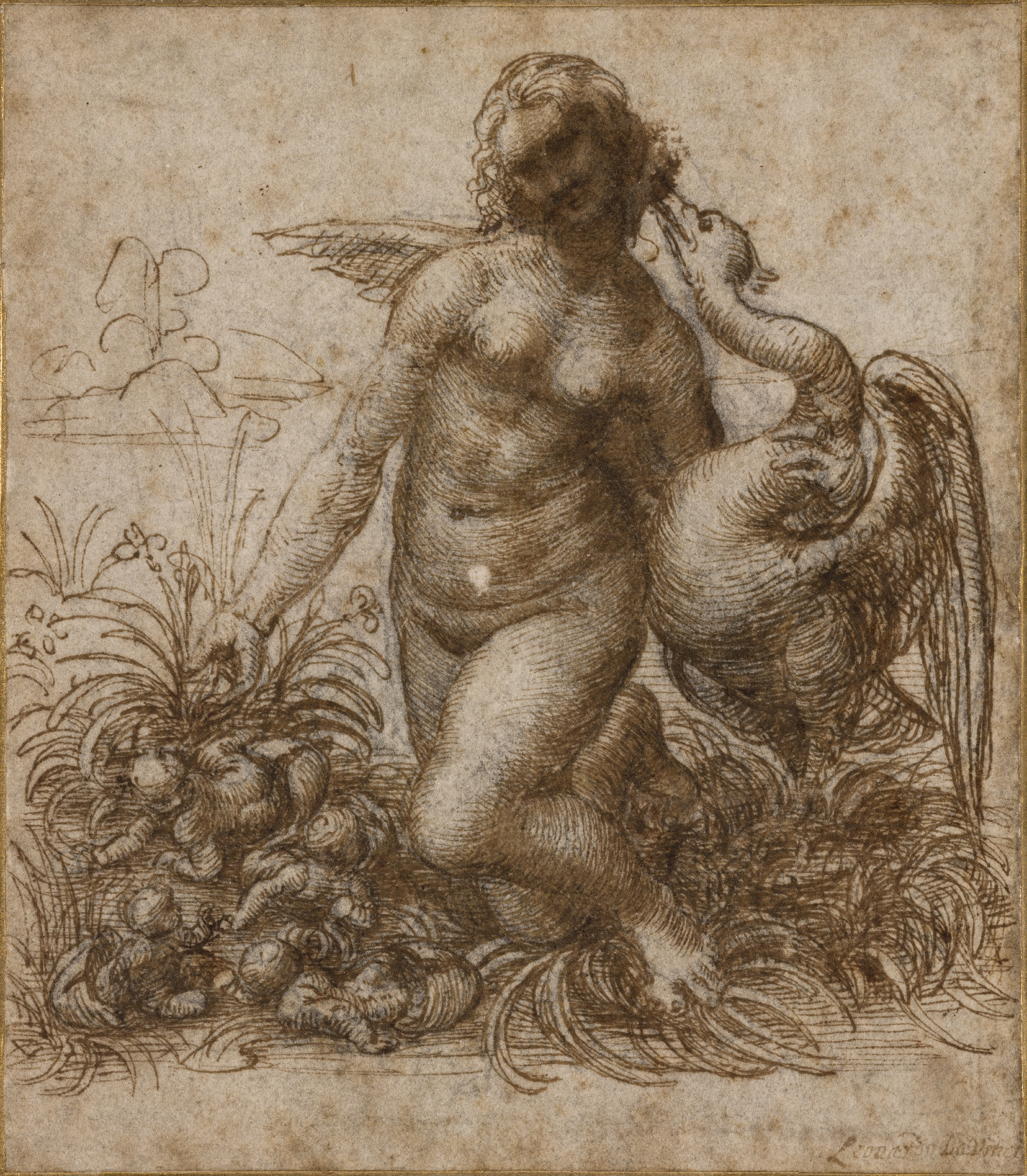
Leonardo, Leda and the Swan, drawing on paper, Chatsworth

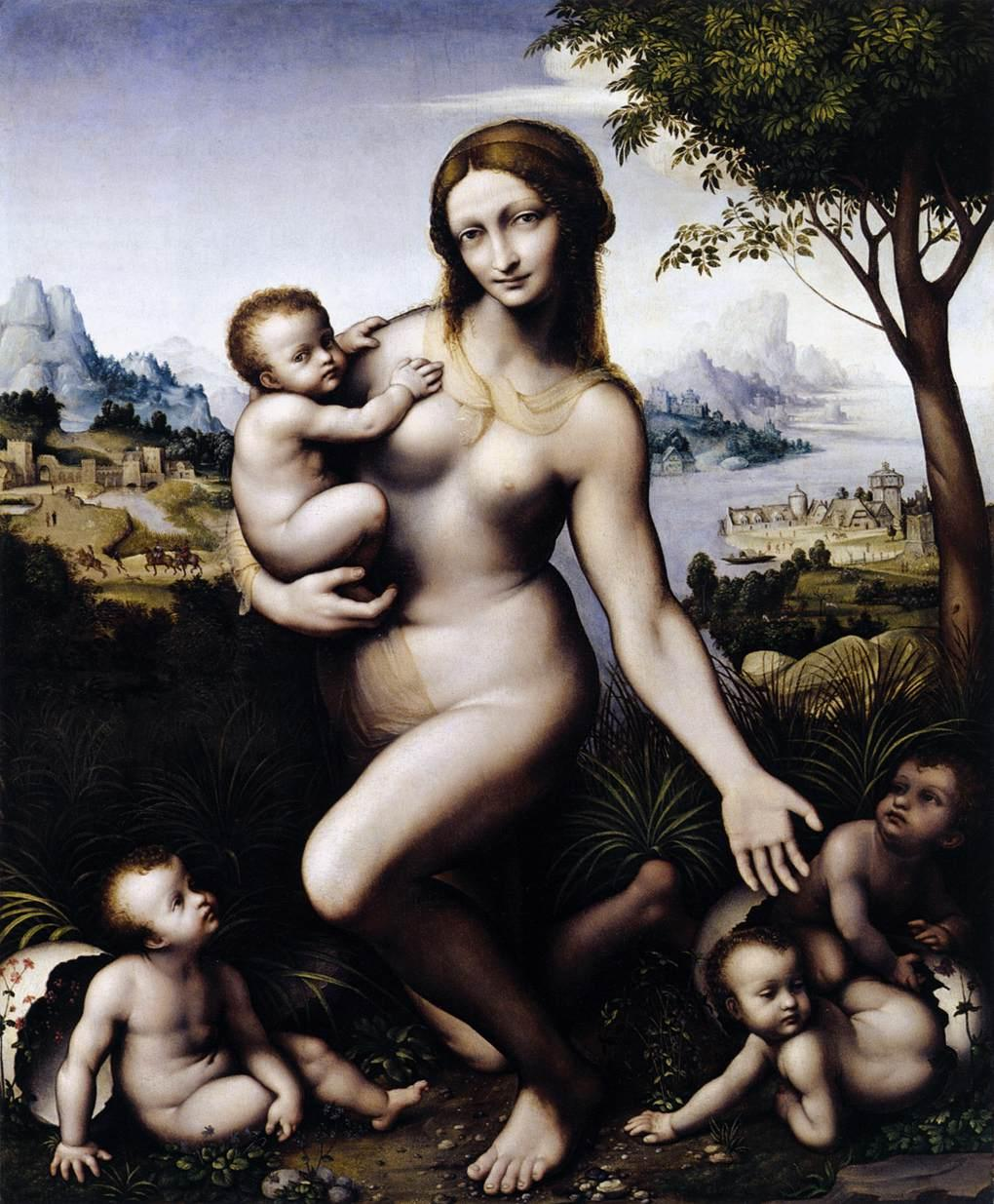
Giampietrino, after Leonardo, Kneeling Leda with her Children

The story of Leda and the Swan was the subject of two compositions by Leonardo da Vinci from perhaps 1503–1510. Neither survive as paintings by Leonardo, but there are a number of drawings for both by him, and copies in oils, especially of the second composition, where Leda stands.

== First version ==
Leonardo began making studies in 1504 for a painting, apparently never executed, of Leda seated on the ground with her children. Three sketches of Leda by Leonardo exist:

- Leda and the Swan, pen and ink and wash over black chalk on paper, 160 x 139 mm. 1503–1507, Devonshire Collection, Chatsworth (pictured)
- Study for kneeling Leda, black chalk, pen and ink on paper, 126 x 109 cm. 1503–1507, Museum Boijmans Van Beuningen, Rotterdam
- Studies of Leda and a Horse, black chalk, brush and ink on paper, 1503–1507, Royal Library, Windsor

It has been proposed that Leonardo's Chatsworth sketch for Leda and the Swan (pictured) may have been inspired by the Laocoön Group, the ancient sculpture discovered in 1506: there is a similar twist to the subject's body; the curve of the swan's neck recalls the snake's lithe body in Laocoön's hand; the rape by Zeus evokes the forceful attack of the serpents; and the child next to Leda's knee resembles Laocoön's son on the right, who also has a sheer break at the wrist. A completed copy of Kneeling Leda with her Children by Giampietrino is kept at the Museumslandschaft Hessen Kassel, Gemäldegalerie Alte Meister, Kassel (c. 1515/20, oil on wood, 128 x 106 cm).

== Completed version ==
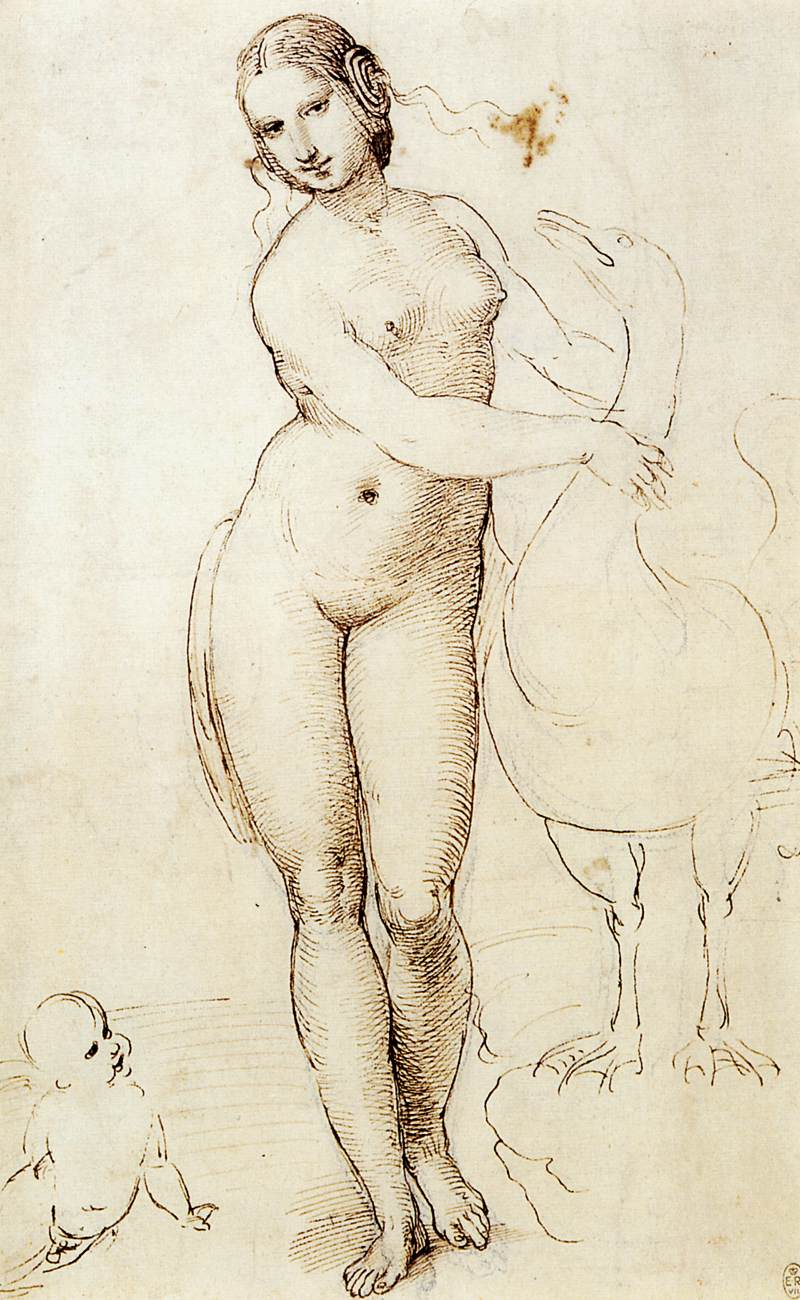
Pen-and-ink drawing by Raphael, presumably after Leonardo (Note: Raphael reused Leda's pose for one of the figures in his The School of Athens.)

In 1508 Leonardo painted a different composition of the subject known as Leda and the Swan which depicted a nude standing Leda cuddling the swan, with the two sets of infant twins and their huge broken egg-shells. The painting is lost, probably deliberately destroyed, and was last recorded in the French royal Château de Fontainebleau in 1625 by Cassiano dal Pozzo:

A standing figure of Leda almost entirely naked, with the swan at her and two eggs, from whose broken shells come forth four babies, This work, although somewhat dry in style, is exquisitely finished, especially in the woman's breast; and for the rest of the landscape and the plant life are rendered with the greatest diligence. Unfortunately the picture is in a bad state because it is done on three long panels which have split apart and broken off a certain amount of paint.

The picture is known from many copies, of which the earliest are probably the Spiridon Leda, perhaps by a studio assistant and now in the Uffizi, and the one by Cesare da Sesto at Wilton House in England. Other copies by Leonardeschi include:

- Anonymous, possibly Fernando Yanez de la Almedina, Leda and the Swan. Oil on panel, 51 5/8 x 30 inches (131.1 x 76.2 cm). Philadelphia Museum of Art, USA (previously at John G. Johnson Collection, 1917)
- Giampietrino, Leda and the Swan, from the collection of the Marquis of Hastings
- Giampietrino, Venus and Cupid, private collection, Milan
- Venus and Cupid, 16th century, oil on panel, New Orleans Museum of Art, USA
- Leda and the Swan, 16th century. Previously at antiquity shop, Lyon. Original photo by Georges Vermard exists at University of Bologna

== Gallery ==
=== Studies ===
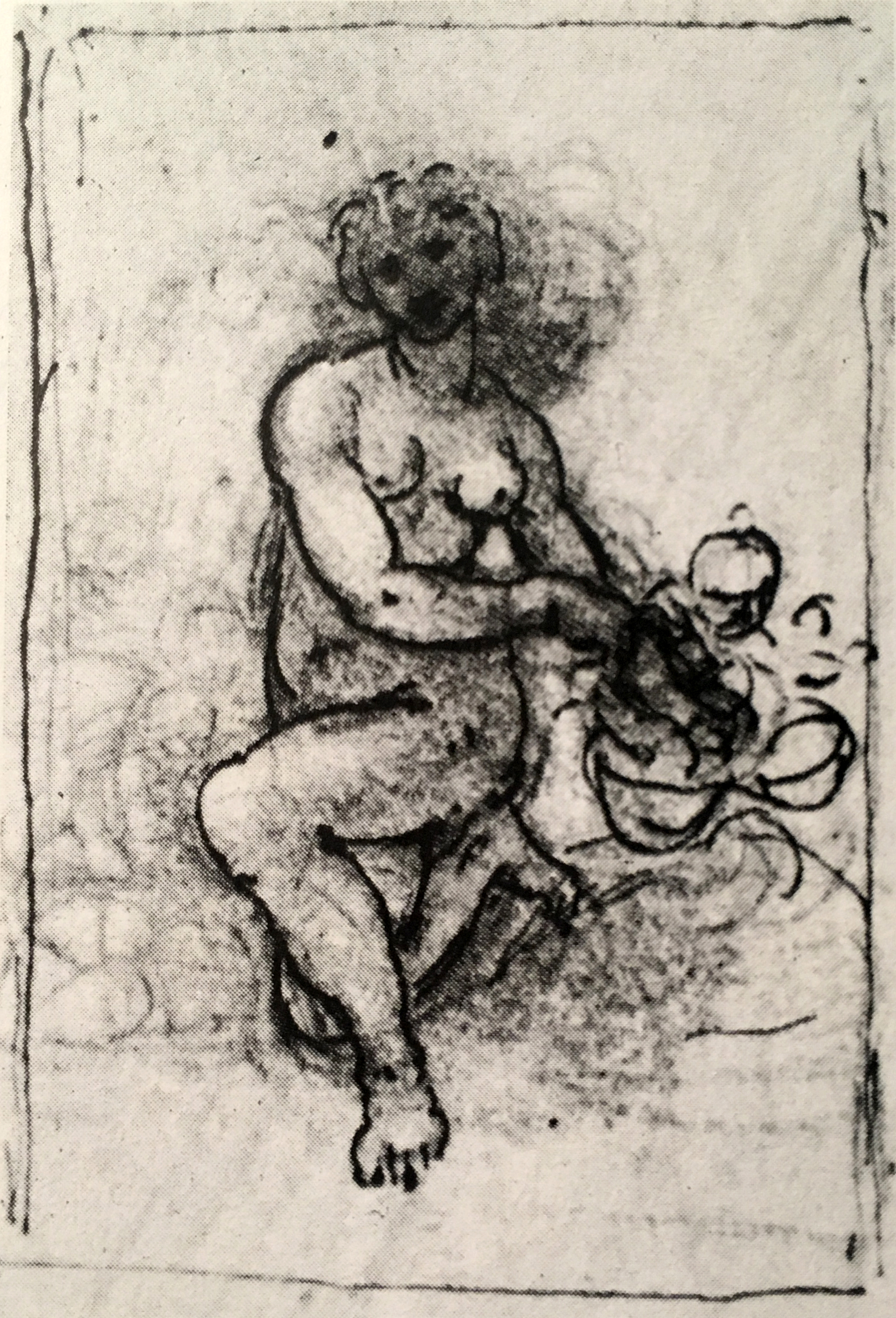
Study for Leda and the Swan by Leonardo, c. 1504

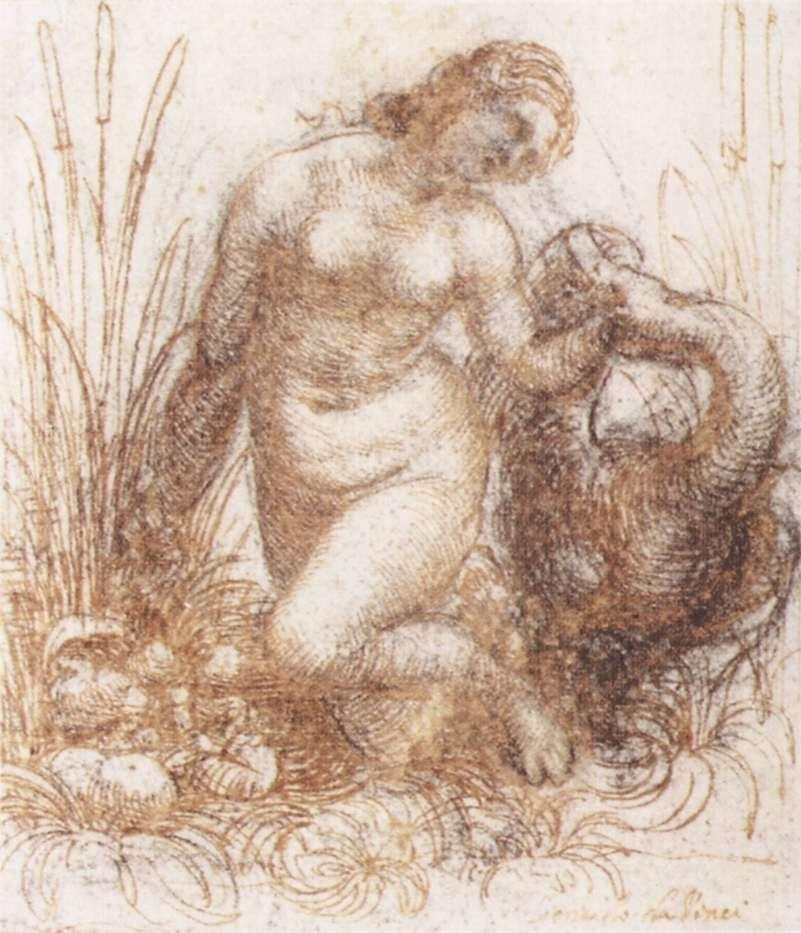
Study for Leda and the Swan by Leonardo, c. 1504

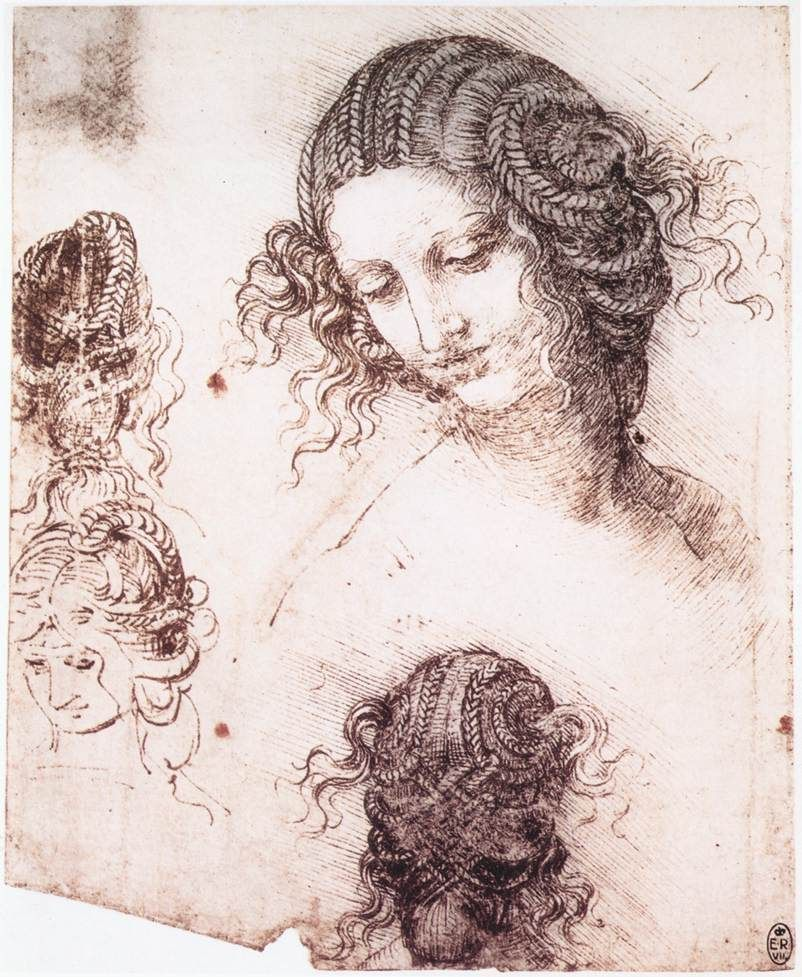
Study of a woman's head and coiffure for Leda and the Swan by Leonardo, c. 1506

=== Copies ===
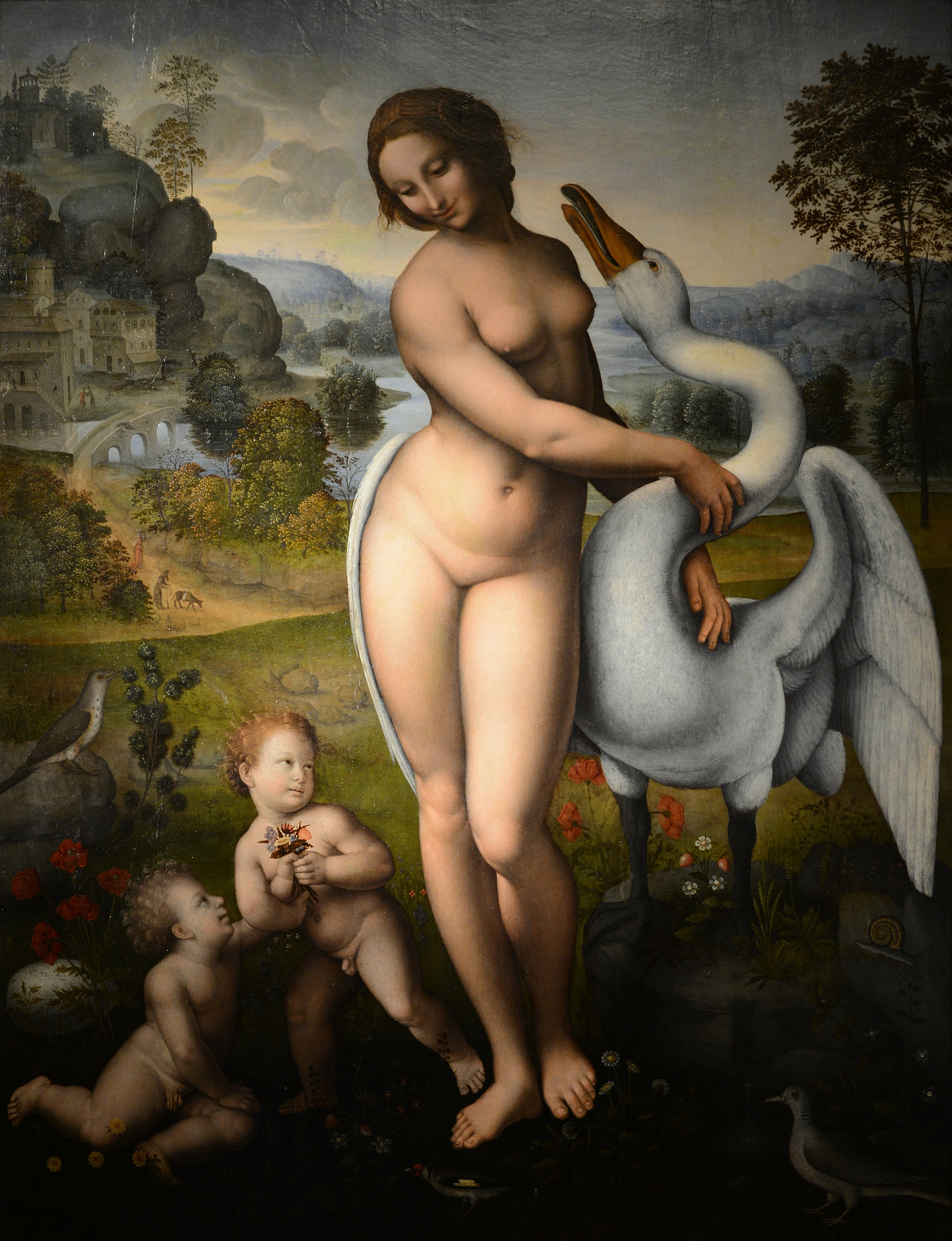
Leda and the Swan, copy attributed to Il Sodoma, c. 1510–1515. Tempera on wood, Galleria Borghese, Rome.

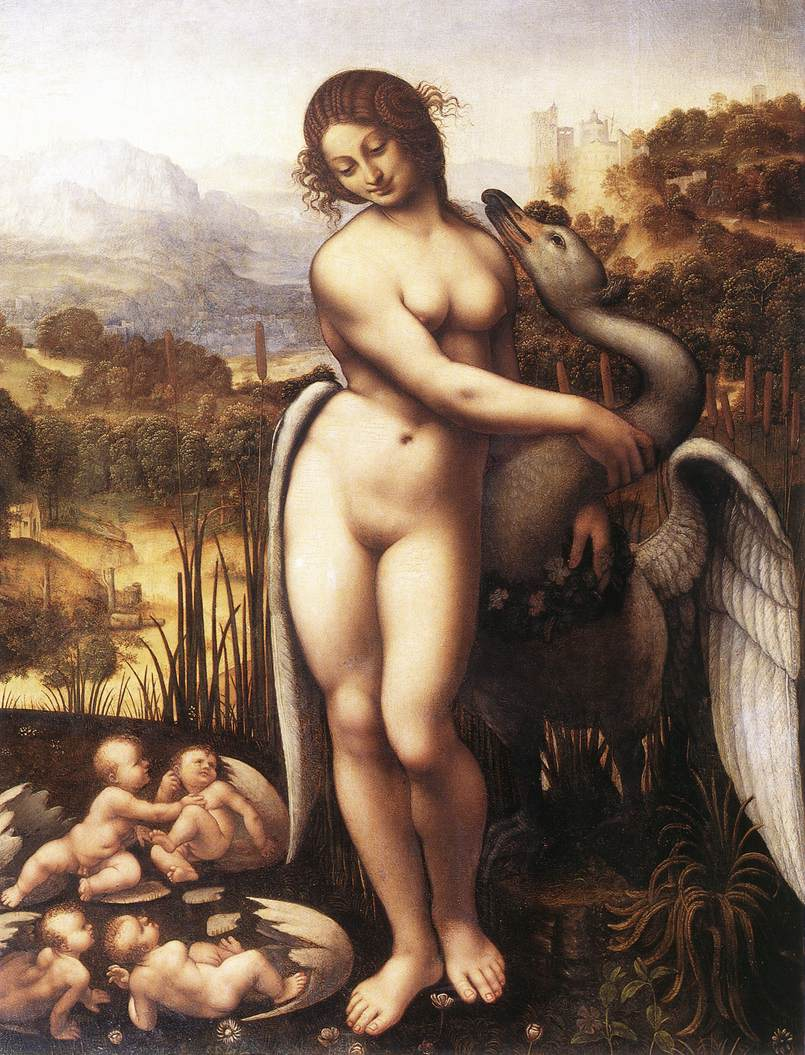
Leda and the Swan, copy by Cesare da Sesto, 1515–1520. Oil on canvas, Wilton House, England

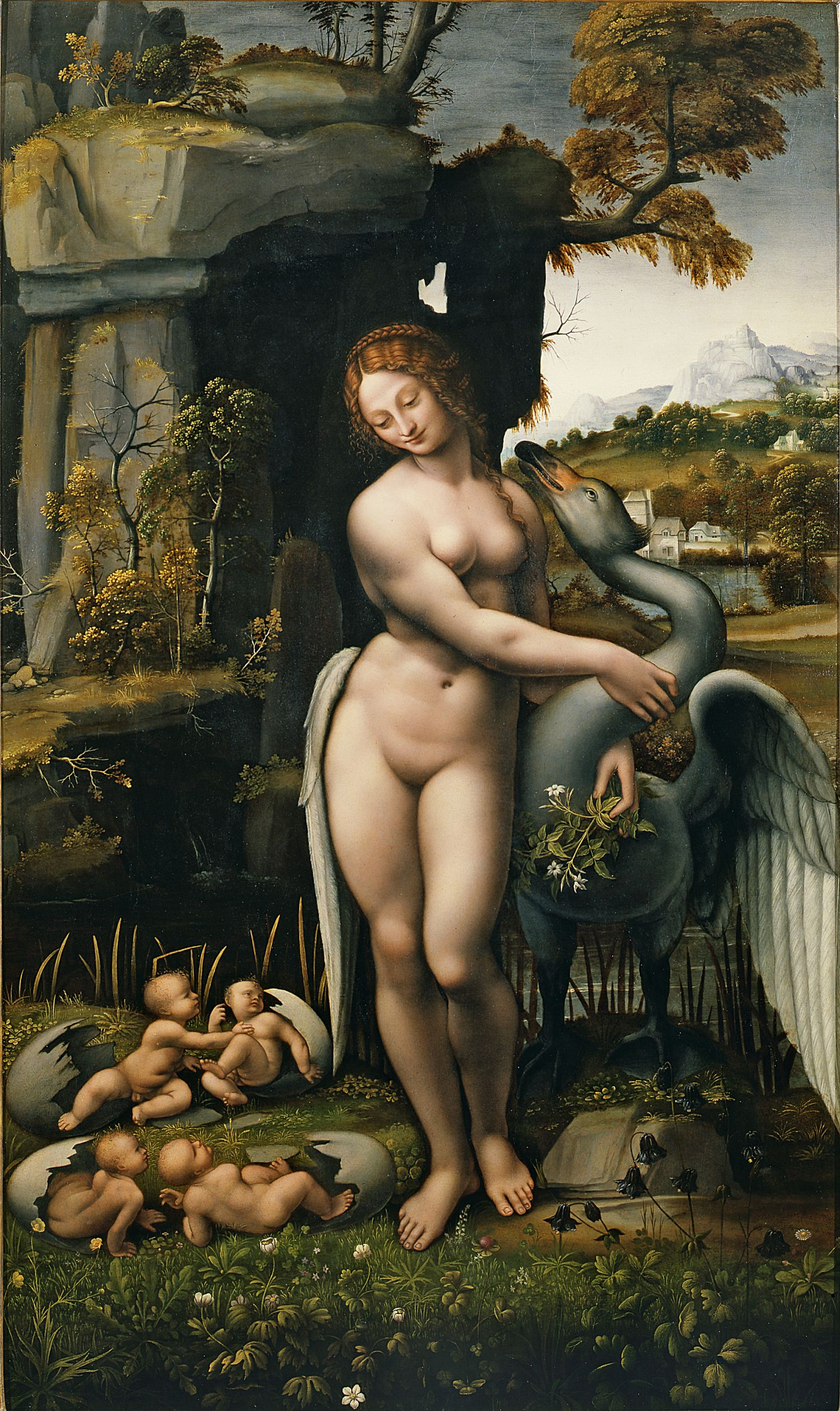
Spiridon Leda, copy probably by Francesco Melzi, c. 1515. Galleria degli Uffizi, Florence

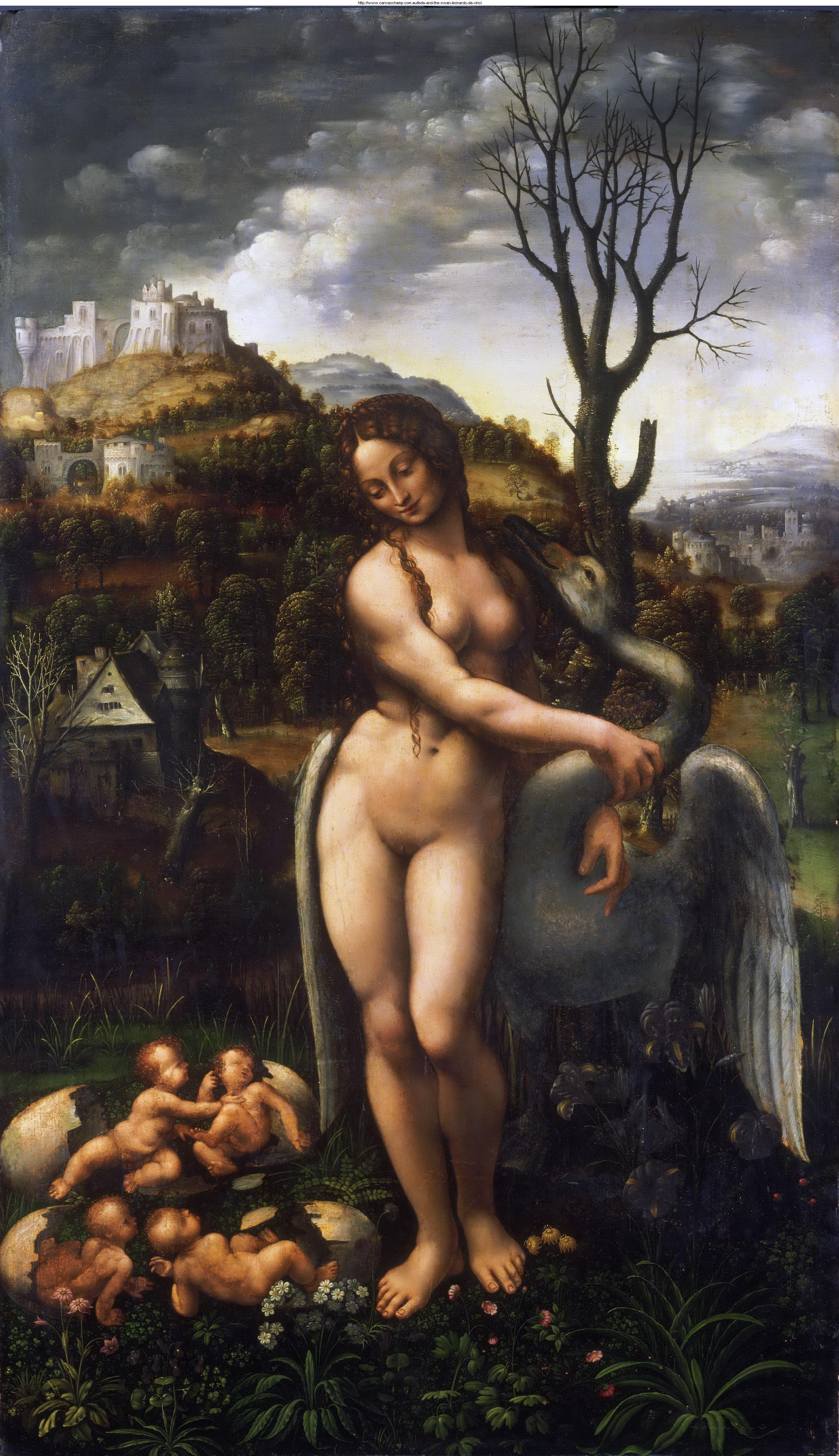
Leda and the Swan, 16th century, oil on panel, Philadelphia Museum of Art, USA

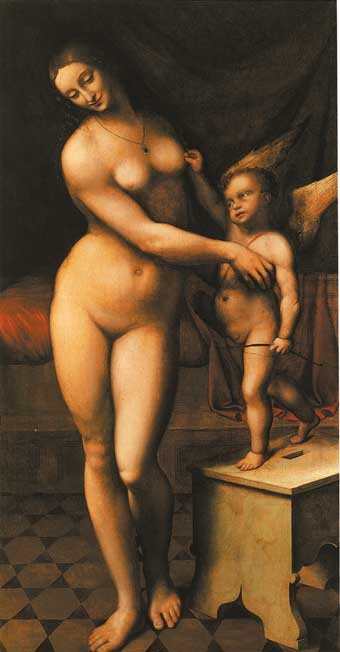
Venus and Cupid by Giampietrino. Private collection, Milan

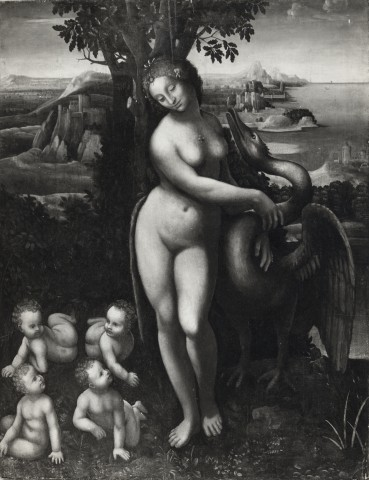
Giampietrino. Leda and the Swan. From the collection of C. Gibbs, London.

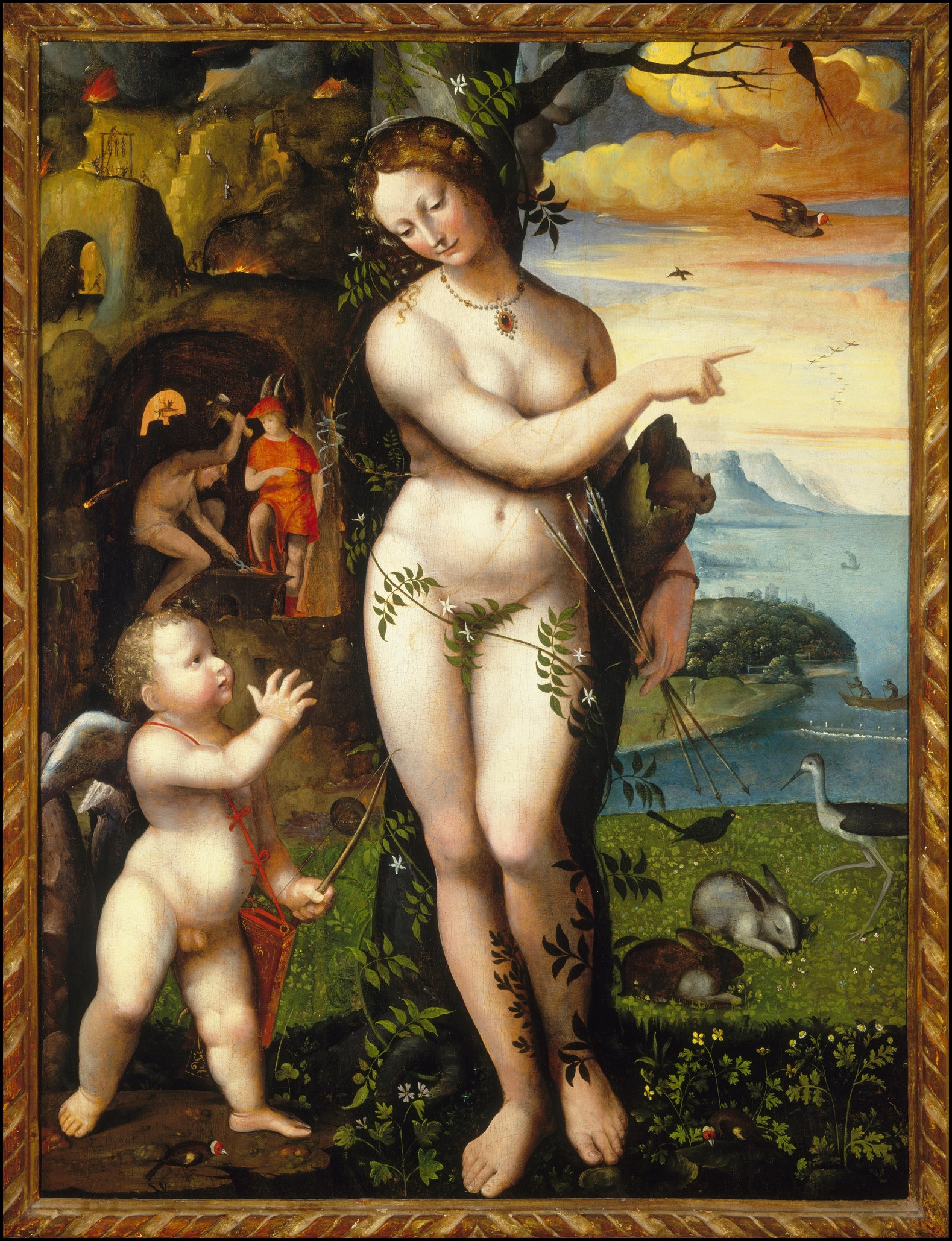
Allegory of Venus, Domenico Beccafumi (Domenico di Giacomo di Pace) or Luca Cambiaso? New Orleans Museum of Art, USA

== See also ==
- List of works by Leonardo da Vinci
- Giovanni Battista Palumba, whose two engravings from the same decade parallel but do not copy Leonardo
