= Madonna of the Cat (Barocci) =

1575 painting by Federico Barocci

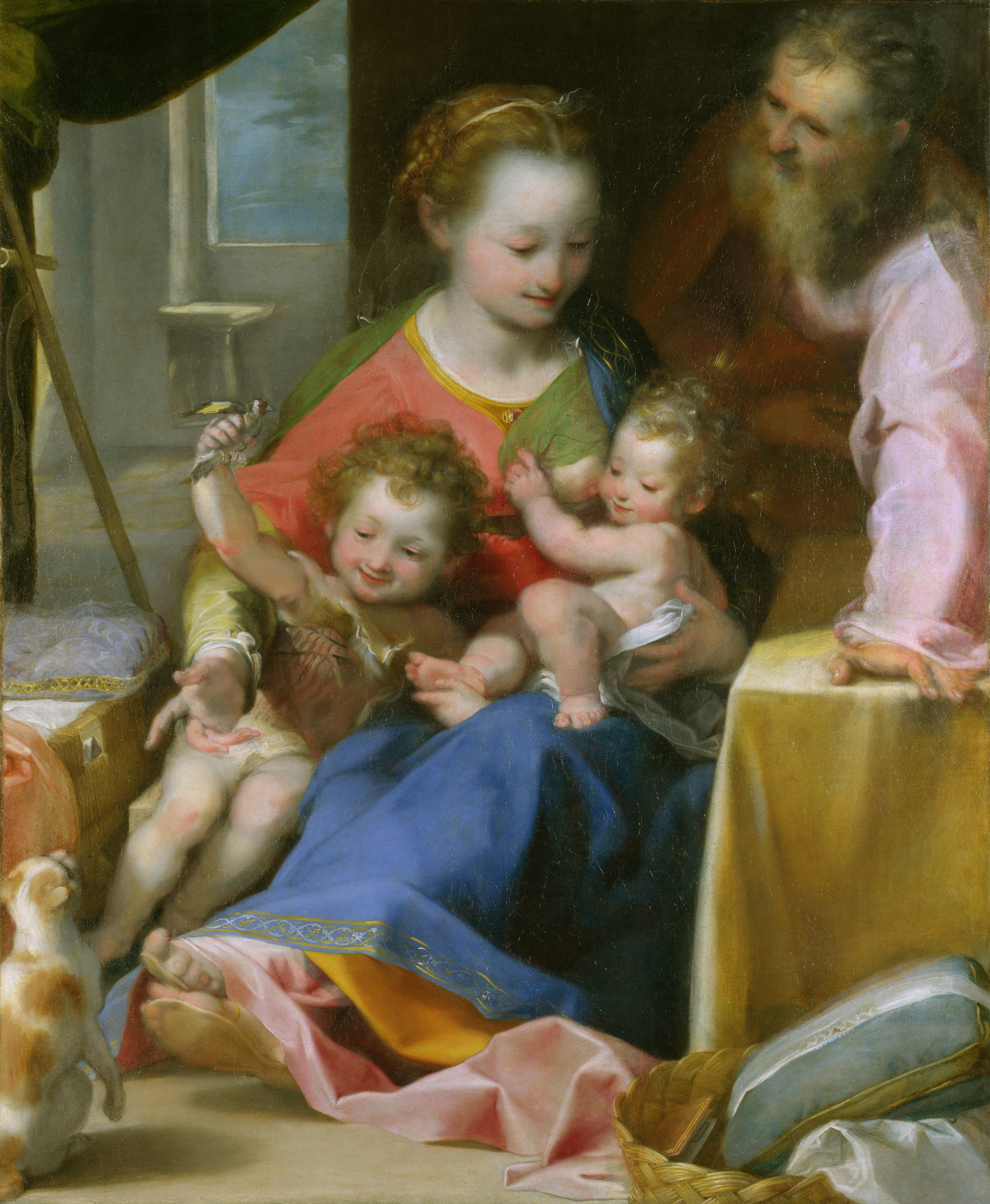
- Artist: Federico Barocci
- Year: 1575
- Medium: Oil on canvas
- Movement: Renaissance, Mannerism
- Dimensions: 112.7 cm × 92.7 cm (44.4 in × 36.5 in)
- Location: National Gallery, London

Madonna of the Cat or Madonna del gatto is an oil on canvas painting by Italian painter Federico Barocci, created c. 1575. It is held in the National Gallery of London.

== History and description ==
The painting was made for Count Antonio Brancaleoni of Piobbico. Engravings of the painting appeared by 1577.

The Holy Family, consisting of Joseph, Mary, a young John the Baptist, and an infant Jesus at Mary's breast, are portrayed in a domestic moment. John appears to be teasing the cat with a captured goldfinch, an allegoric symbol of Christ’s Passion. John's reed rests against a wall in the background. The main characters form a proto-Baroque-style diagonal to the right. In the style of Barocci, the cheeks are rosy.

== Another version ==
There is another version of this painting in the Musée Condé, in Chantilly. This version, which the museum names The Holy Family with a Cat, does not contain any visible X-ray changes, unlike the one in London. The original work is believed to be therefore be the one in London, while the one in Chantilly would be a replica made in the artist's studio with the participation of his disciples.

== See also ==
- Breastfeeding in art
- Study for the Madonna of the Cat (Leonardo da Vinci)
