= Andrea del Brescianino =

Italian painter

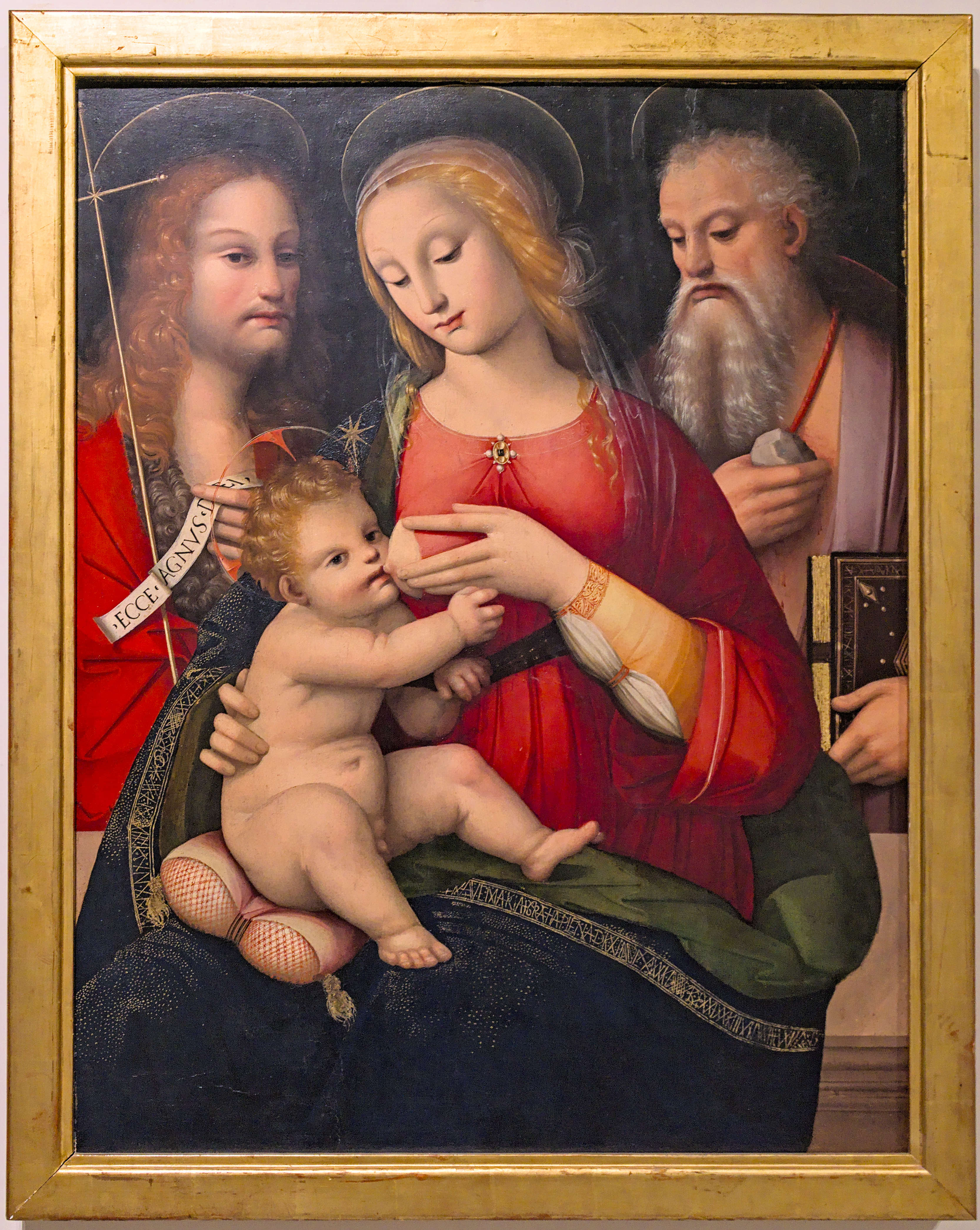
Madonna with Infant, John the Baptist, and Hieronymus, Museo d'Arte Sacra della Val d'Arbia, Buonconvento, Siena

Andrea del Brescianino or Dei Piccinelli was an Italian painter of the Renaissance period, active mainly in Siena. Together with his brother Raffaello they were known as the Brescianini of Siena.

== Biography ==
He was the son of a dancing-master at Siena, where he flourished from 1507 to 1525. He was the pupil of a Sienese painter, named Giovanni Battista Giusi, and they together painted an altar-piece, representing the Virgin and Child, with Saints, which is in the Siena Academy. In 1524, he painted the Baptism of Christ for the baptistery of the cathedral of the same city. In 1525 the brothers went to Florence, and in the same year Andrea, and probably Raffaello also, was registered in the Painters' Guild. A Holy Family by Andrea, who was the better artist of the two, is in the Uffizi Gallery at Florence, and another Holy Family, ascribed to him, is in the Berlin Gallery. The beautiful altar-piece, a Holy Family displayed at the church of Torre di Bibiano, long attributed to Baldassare Peruzzi, has been attributed to Andrea. The brothers appear to have worked under the influence of Fra Bartolommeo.
