= Study for the Madonna of the Cat =

Drawing by Leonardo da Vinci

- Studio per la madonna del gatto (Italian)
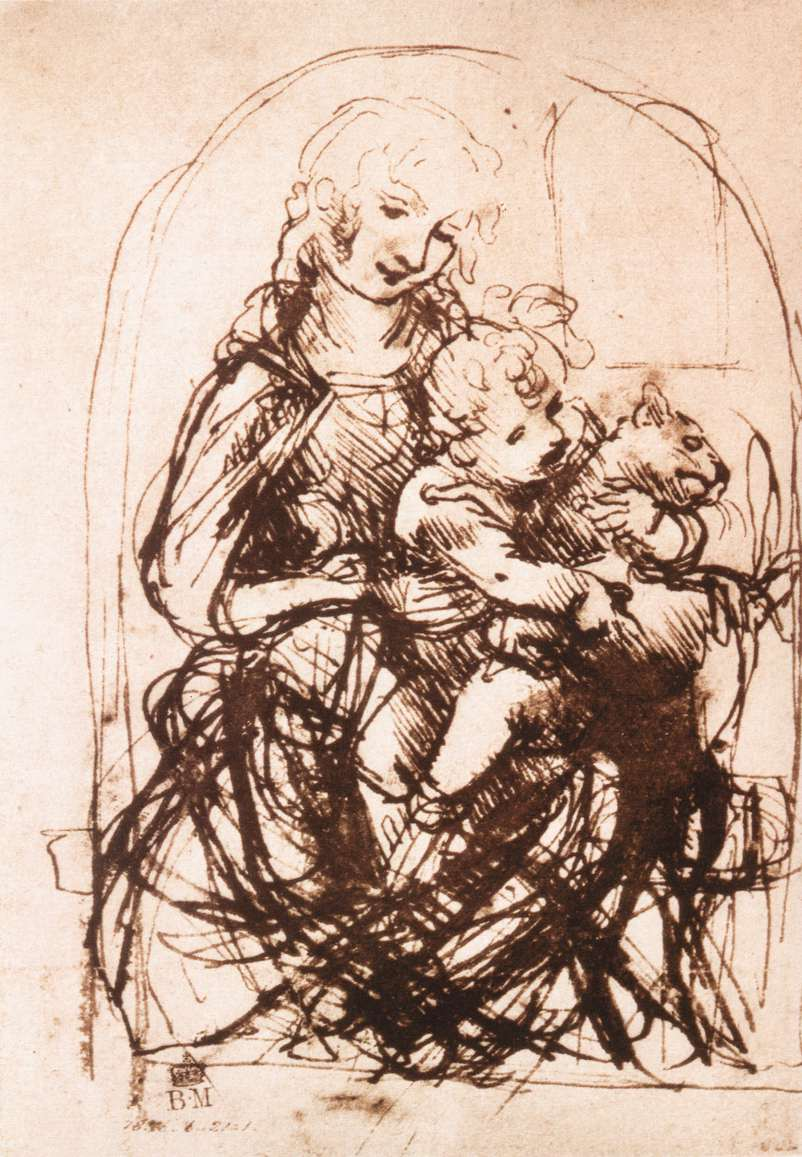
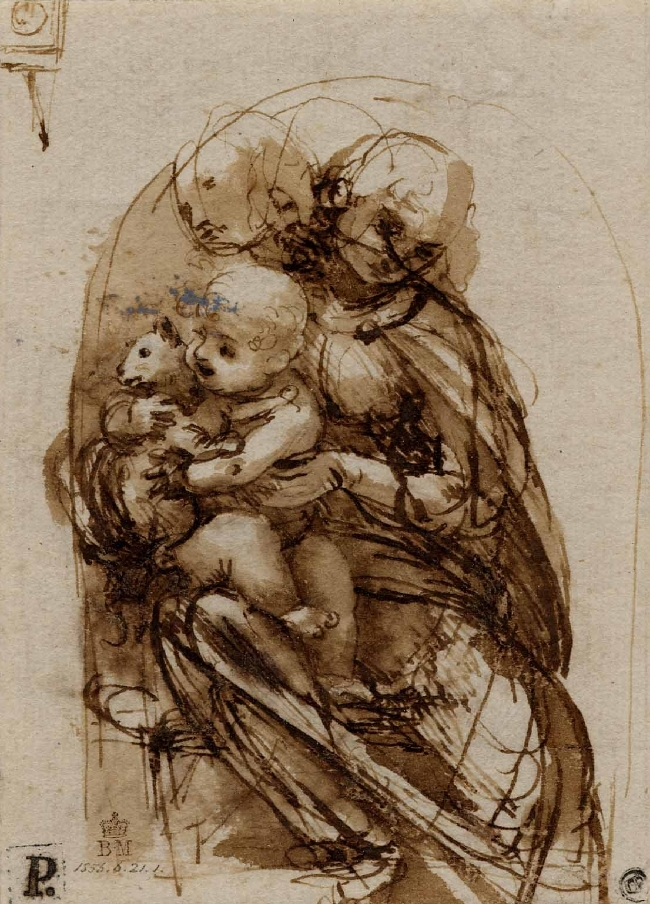
- Recto (left), Verso (right)
- Artist: Leonardo da Vinci
- Year: c. 1478–1481
- Medium: pen and brown ink, on a preparatory drawing in stylus, with a brown wash on the back
- Dimensions: 13 cm × 9.4 cm (5.1 in × 3.7 in)
- Location: British Museum, London
- Accession: 1856,0621.1

Study for the Madonna of the Cat is a set of two drawings by Leonardo da Vinci on both sides (front and back) of a sheet of paper 13 centimeters high and 9.4 centimeters wide. The two drawings were made in pen and brown ink, on a preparatory drawing in stylus, with a brown wash on the back. This is one of the six works of Leonardo da Vinci showing the Virgin and Child playing with a cat or carrying it. A mirror symmetry between the drawings of the two faces is visible by transparency. The Study for the Madonna of the Cat is currently held at the British Museum in London under inventory number 1856,0621.1. The creative and scientific processes underlying the drawing Madonna of the Cat have been discussed by many art historians, including Kenneth Clark, Martin Kemp, Carmen Bambach and Larry Feinberg.

== Related drawings by Leonardo ==
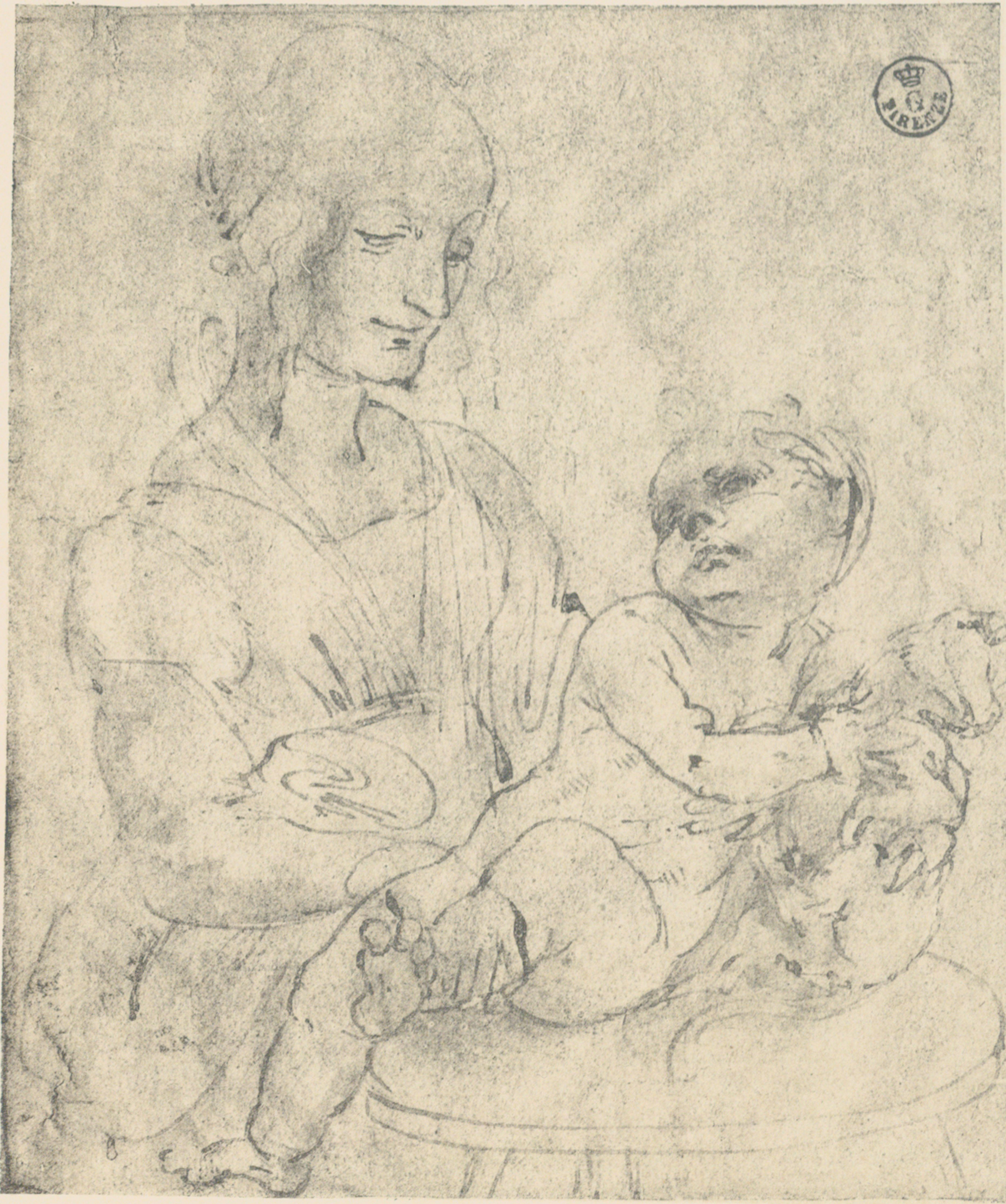
Virgin and Child with cat, recto, Uffizi

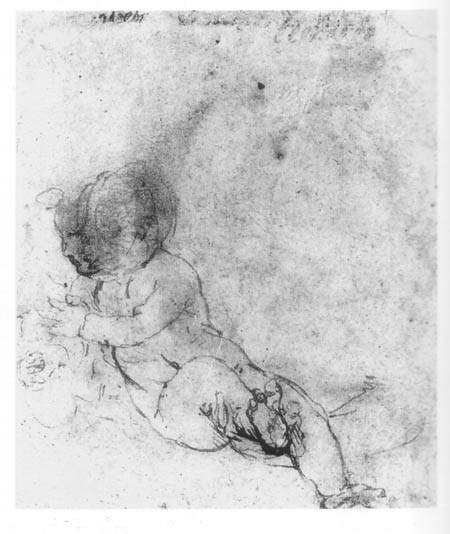
Virgin and Child with cat, verso, Uffizi

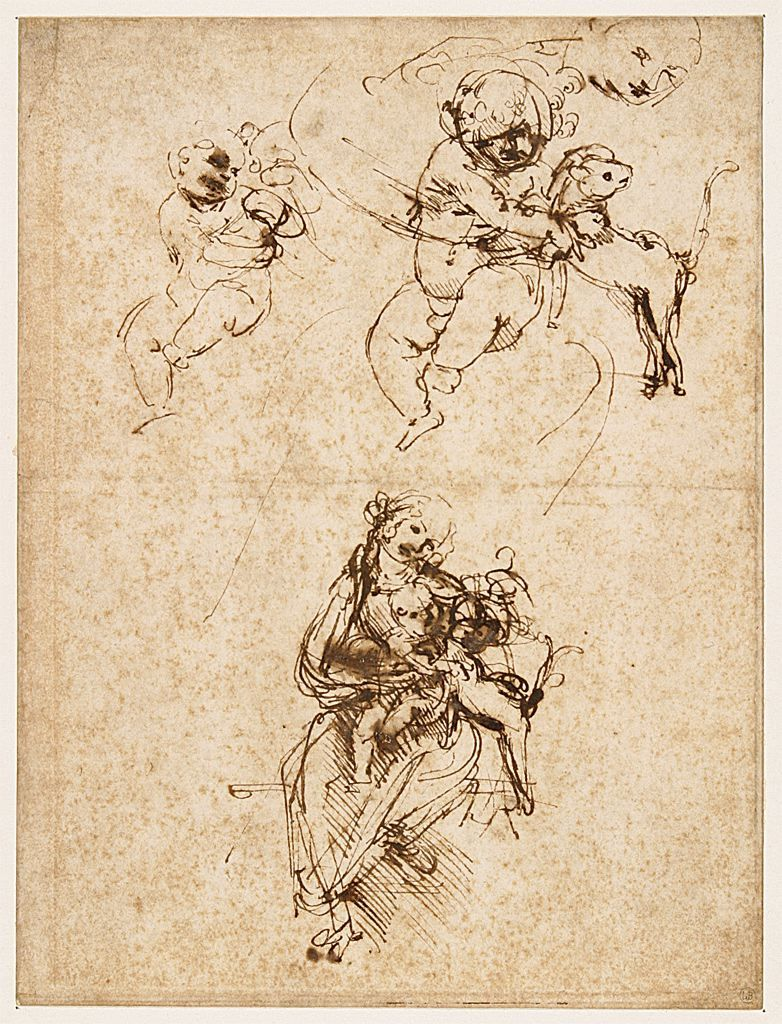
Virgin and Child with cat, Musée Bonnat

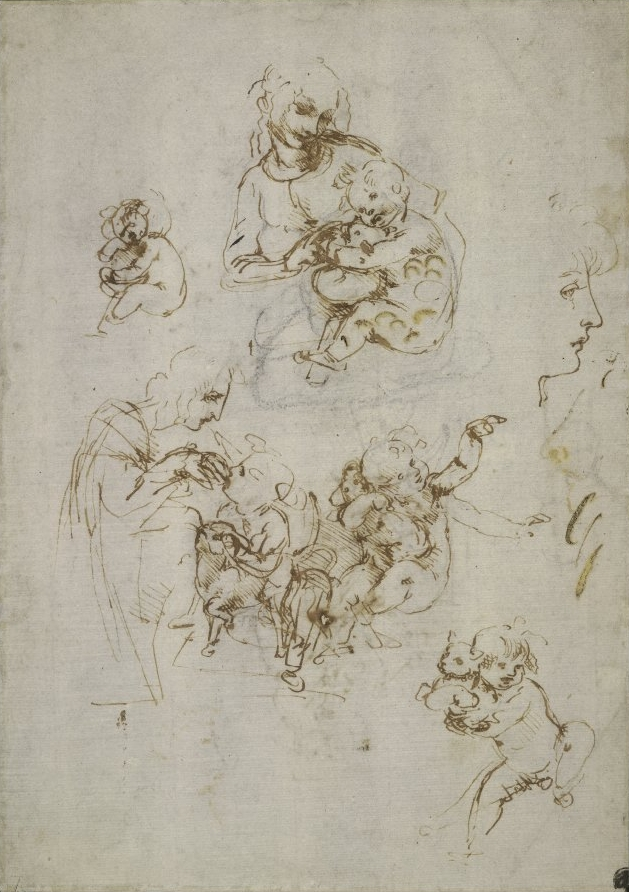
Christ Child with cat, recto, British Museum

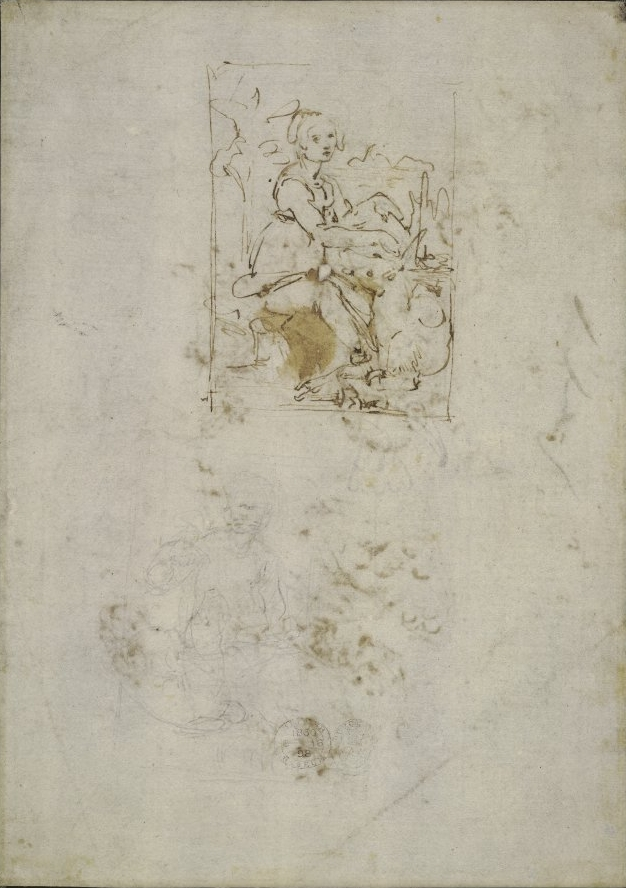
Christ Child with cat, verso, British Museum

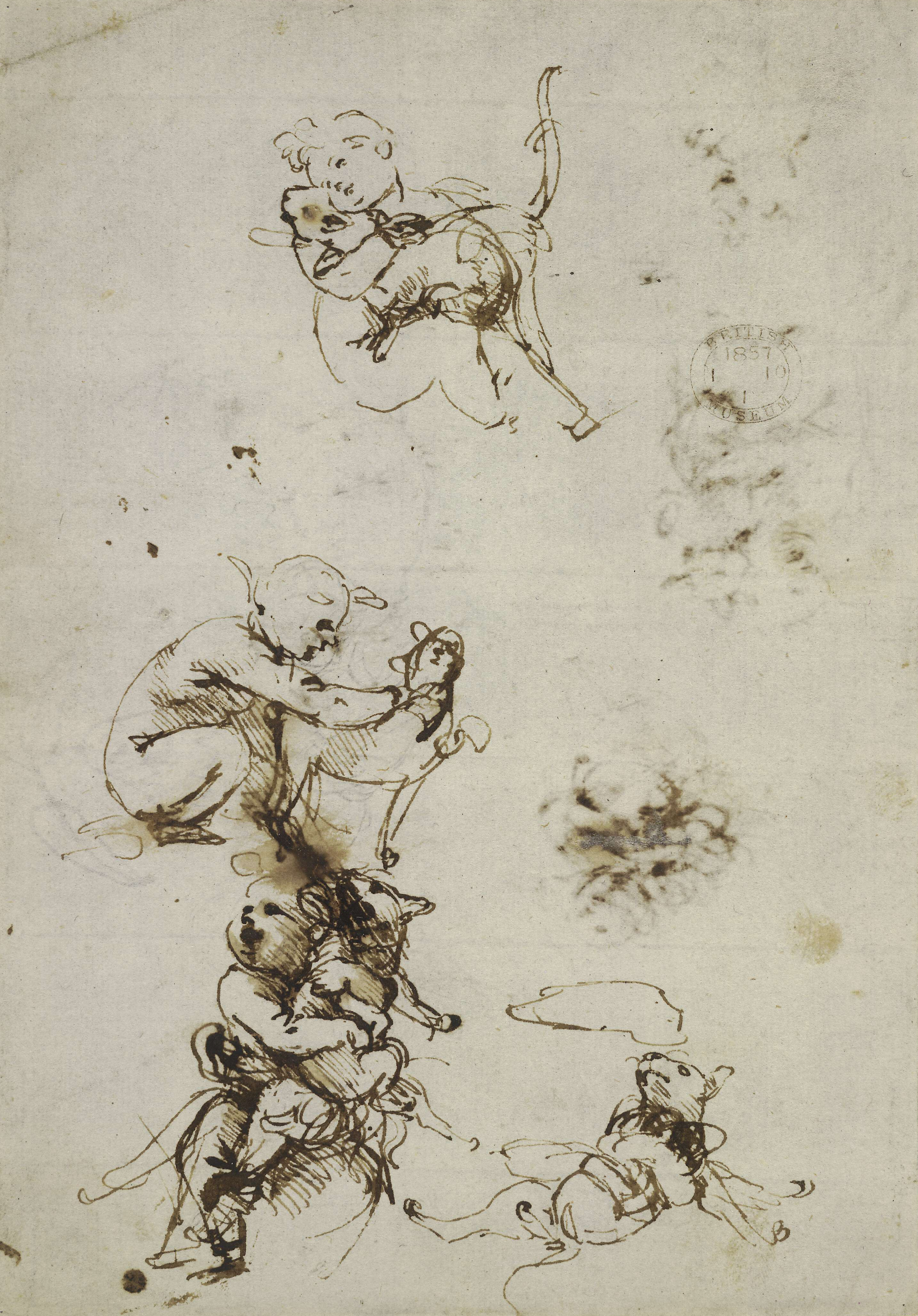
Christ Child with cat, recto, British Museum

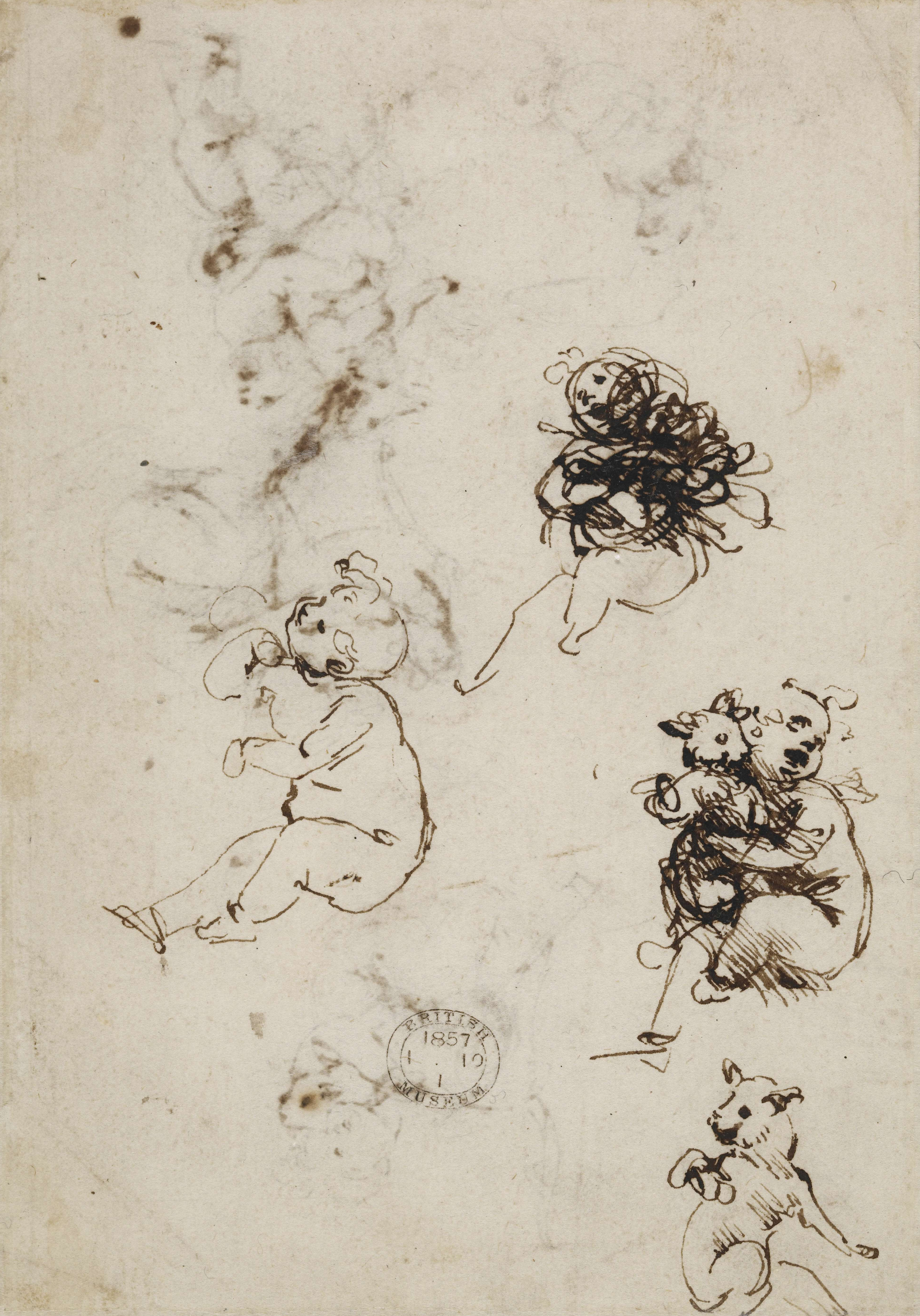
Christ Child with cat, verso, British Museum

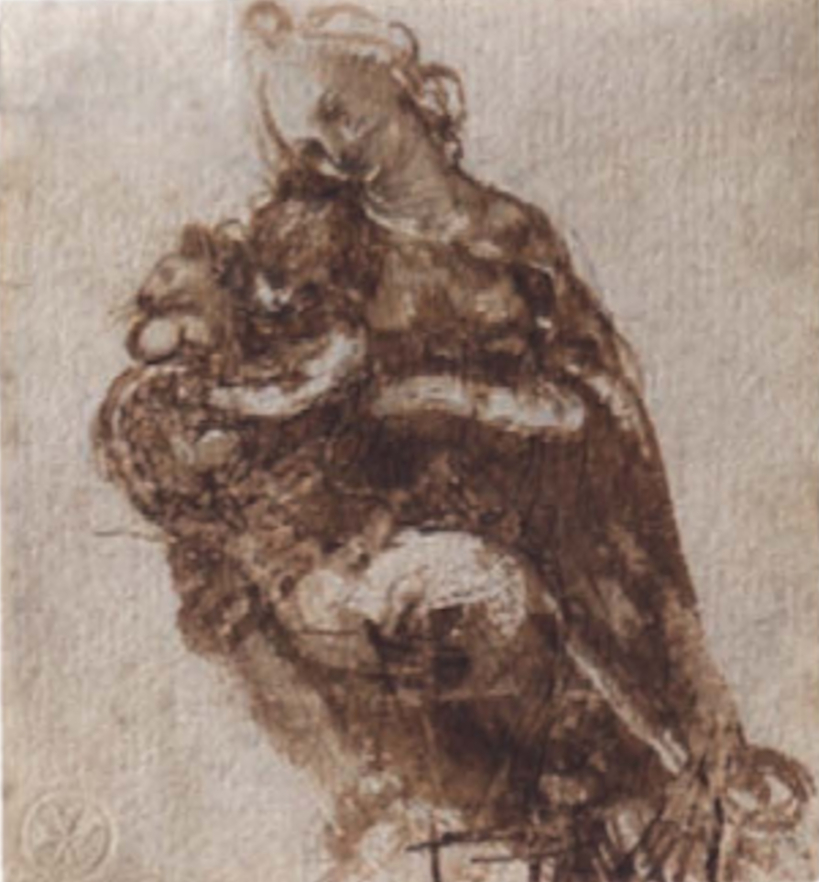
Virgin and Child with cat, private collection, NYC

== See also ==
- List of works by Leonardo da Vinci
- Madonna of the Cat (Federico Barocci)
