= Raffaello del Brescianino =

Italian painter

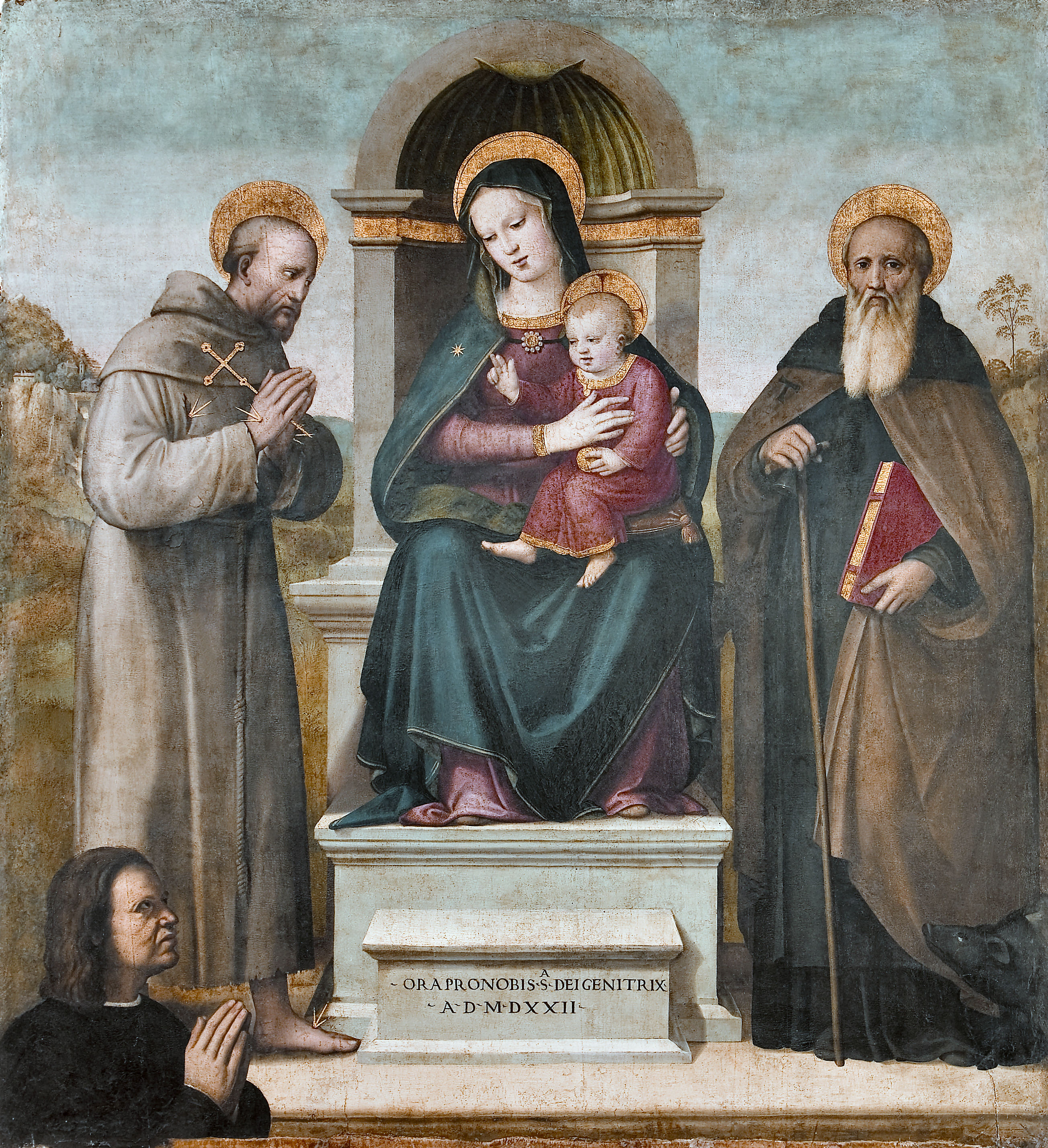
Enthroned Madonna with the Infant and Saints, Certaldo, Museo di arte sacra, 1522

Raffaello del Brescianino or Dei Piccinelli was an Italian painter of the Renaissance period, active in Siena. Together with his brother Andrea, they were known as the Brescianini of Siena. He was the son of a dancing-master at Siena, where he flourished from 1507 to 1525. He was the pupil of a Sienese painter, named Giovan Battista Giusi, and they together painted an altar-piece, representing the 'Virgin and Child, with Saints,' which is in the Siena Academy, and in 1524 the 'Baptism of Christ,' for the baptistery of the cathedral of the same city. In 1525 the brothers went to Florence, and in the same year Andrea, and probably Raffaello also, was registered in the Painters' Guild. The brothers appear to have worked under the influence of Fra Bartolommeo. Raffaello died at Florence in 1545.
