= Agius =

Agius is a Maltese surname. It is probably a latinisation of the Greek word agios, meaning "saintly" or "holy". Another origin is from Arabic ʿajūz, meaning "old man" or "old woman".

People with this surname include:

- Adam Agius (born 1971), Australian member of the progressive metal band Alchemist
- Ambrose Agius (1856–1911), Maltese bishop
- Andrei Agius (born 1986), Maltese footballer
- Anthony Agius Decelis, Maltese politician
- Dale Agius, South Australia's inuaugural Commissioner for First Nations Voice
- David Agius, Maltese politician
- Dionisius A. Agius (born 1945), Maltese professor of Arabic Studies and Islamic Material Culture
- Edmond Agius (born 1987), Maltese footballer
- Emmanuel Agius (born 1954), Maltese philosopher, theologian, priest
- Fred Agius (born 1984), Australian footballer
- Gilbert Agius (born 1974), Maltese footballer
- Giovanni Pietro Francesco Agius de Soldanis (1712–1770), Maltese linguist, historian and cleric
- Jamie Agius, Australian actor, in Short Changed (1986)
- Jason Agius (born 1994), Australian actor and screenwriter
- Joanna Agius (born 1958), Maltese archer
- Joe Agius (born 1992), Australian musician, singer and performer
- Joe Agius (architect), Australian architect
- Josie Agius (1934–2015), one of South Australia's first Aboriginal health workers and educators
- Malcolm Paul Agius Galea, Maltese politician
- Marcus Agius (born 1946), British financier and businessman
- Neil Agius (born 1986), Maltese swimmer
- Peter Agius (born 1979), Maltese politician
- Ross Agius, Australian rules footballer (1979–1984)
- Sébastien Agius (born 1983), French singer
- Senna Agius (born 2005), Australian motorcycle racer
