= Studies of an Infant =

Drawing by Leonardo da Vinci

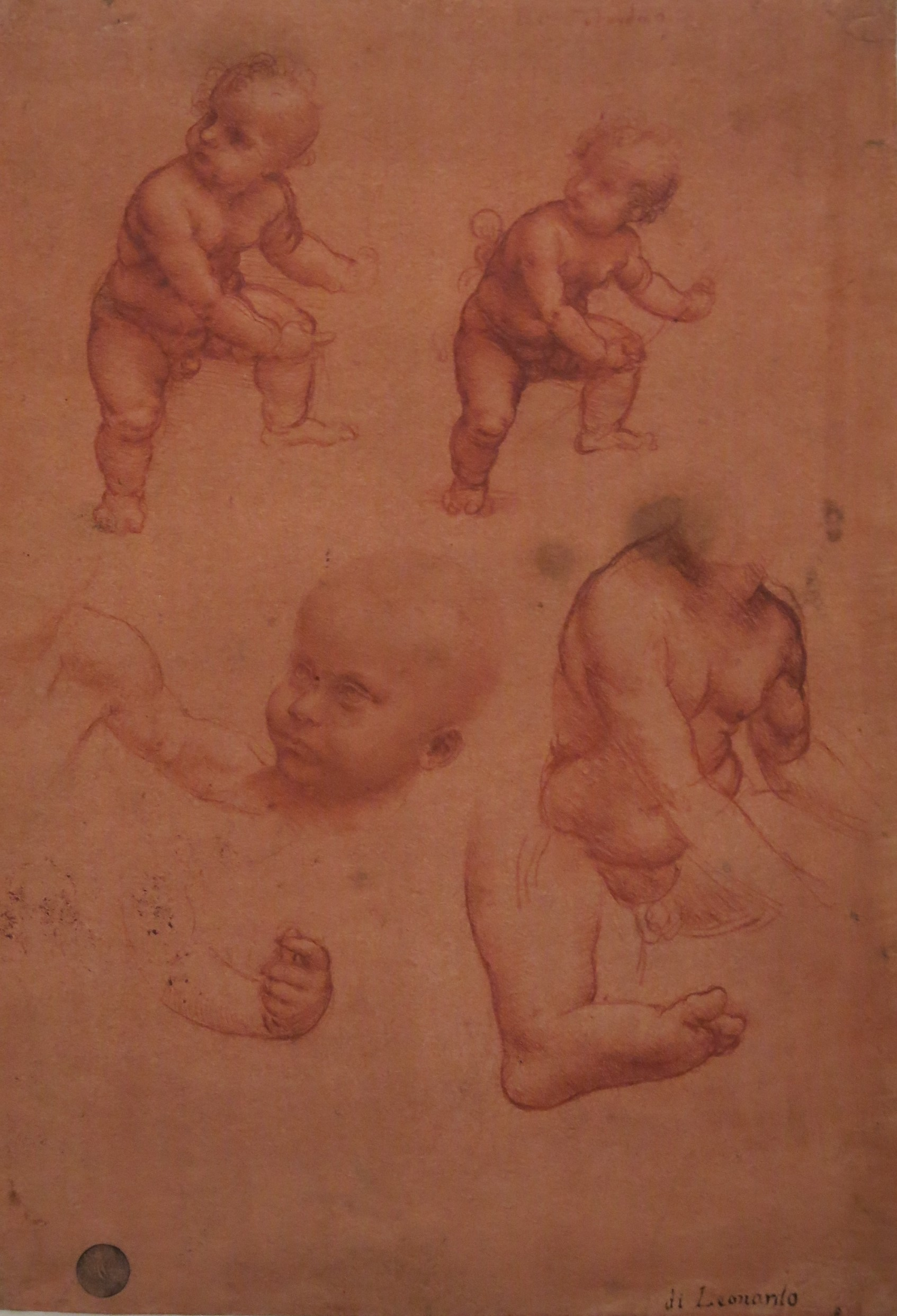
- Red chalk, white gouache highlights on red ochre paper
- Artist: Leonardo da Vinci
- Year: 1502–1503
- Dimensions: 28.5 cm × 19.8 cm (11.2 in × 7.8 in)
- Location: Gallerie dell'Accademia, Venice, Italy

Studies of an Infant is a set of eight red chalk drawings on red ochre-prepared paper by Leonardo da Vinci, housed in the Gallerie dell'Accademia in Venice. These are representations of all or part of the body of a very young child, considered to be preparatory studies for the Infant Jesus in the oil painting The Virgin and Child with Saint Anne in the Louvre.

Probably produced around 1502–1503, although some researchers put the date back to between 1508 and 1511, this set belongs to a group of studies that enabled the painter to create the draft for the painting at the same period. In particular, the sheet is similar to two other studies of the Infant using an identical technique known as "red on red".

The Florentine master reveals the full extent of his knowledge of anatomy, physiology and physics. In addition, some parts of the work feature a graphic technique so applied that it has contributed to casting doubt on the work's autograph character.

== Description ==
The drawings in Studies of an Infant are on a rectangular sheet of paper prepared in red ochre, measuring 28.5 × 19.8 cm. They are executed in red chalk, some with white highlights. The top right-hand corner of the sheet is inscribed "Ambroso" in inverted script.

The document features eight croquis, each representing the whole or part of a baby's body, with the common visible parts adopting identical postures: at the top, two babies with the most finished pencil work; between them, a barely visible sketch; below left, one above the other, two sketches of arms; a head in the center of the sheet; a bust to its right; and, below the latter, a foot.

== History ==
=== Creation context ===
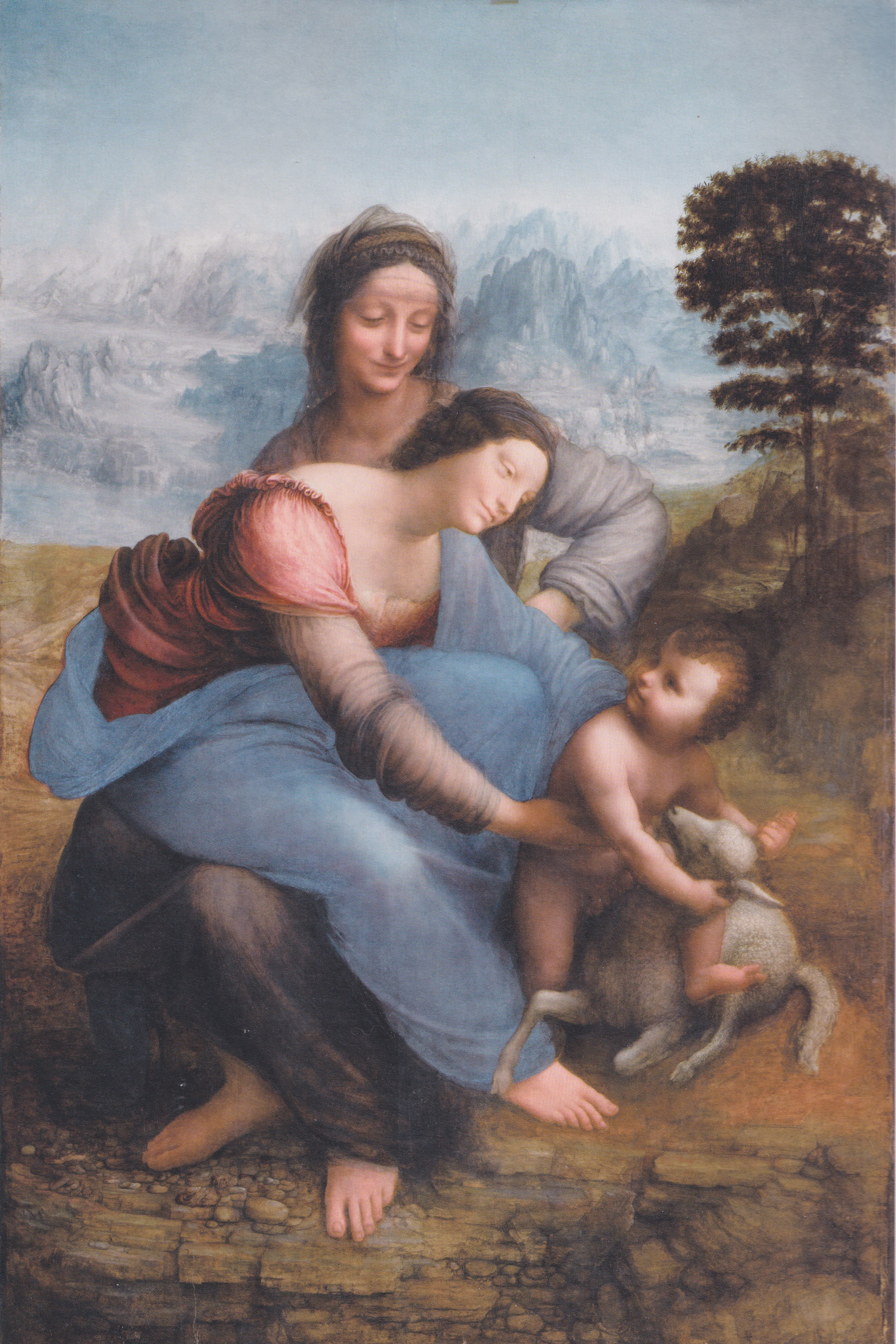
The drawing was created as part of The Virgin and Child with Saint Anne (1503–1519)

When the drawings for the Studies of an Infant were created in 1502–1503, Leonardo da Vinci was approaching his fiftieth birthday. He was famous enough for powerful Italian and other European clients to compete for his services as engineer and artist: Isabella d'Este, Cesare Borgia and King Louis XII of France.

Since 1499, he has been working on the creation of the Virgin and Child with Saint Anne oil painting, although it remains unclear who exactly commissioned it. A self-confessed detachment from the brush, Leonardo produced few works during this period: The Last Supper (completed in 1498) and The Madonna of the Yarnwinder (dated from 1501); however, he considered himself more of an engineer. After successively discarding two earlier works: Burlington House drawing (between 1499 and early 1501) and the so-called "Fra Pietro" drawing (between 1500 and April 1501); he produced a final one in 1502–1503, which he used to create The Virgin and Child with Saint Anne painting. The Studies of an Infant sheet is a preparatory study for this third draft.

=== Attribution and dating ===
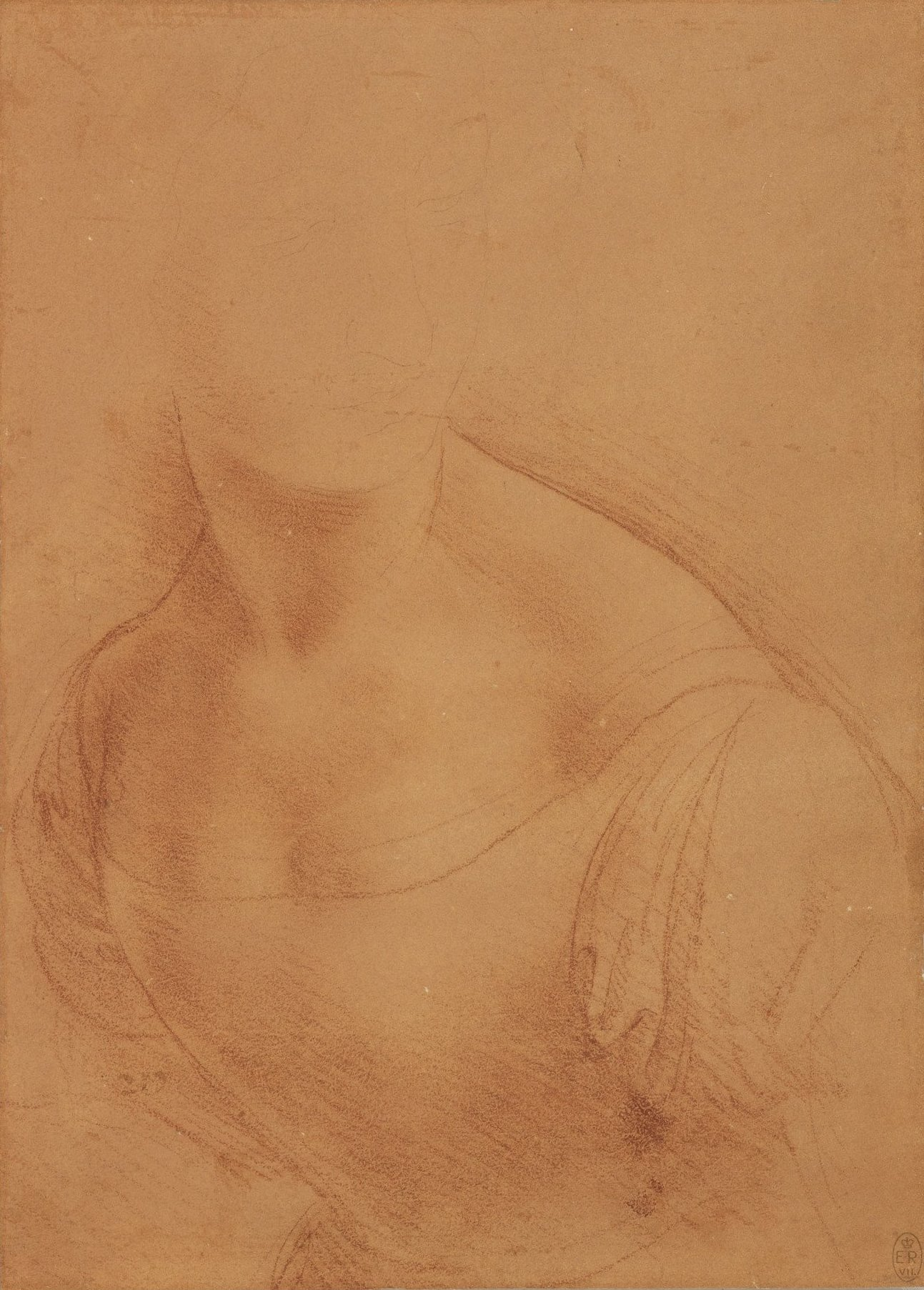
Leonardo da Vinci uses the same red-on-red technique in his Study for the bust of Madonna of the Yarnwinder (circa 1500, Windsor Castle).

Until the early 1990s, attribution to Leonardo da Vinci was the subject of much debate. In 1938, art historian Bernard Berenson admitted his great hesitation. As late as 1980, Luisa Cogliati Arano saw it as the work of Cesare da Sesto or Ambrogio de Predis. Since then, the attribution to the Florentine painter has been unanimous among the scientific community, including Daniel Arasse, Carlo Pedretti, Carmen C. Bambach, Martin Kemp, Frank Zöllner, Johannes Nathan and Vincent Delieuvin. For this, the researchers relied on the fine hatching typical of a left hand, particularly visible on the whole baby in the upper right-hand corner. Moreover, stylistically, the work reveals "vibrations of [...] a very free touch", offering an energetic character typical of the first sketches that a researching artist can show. This is the exact opposite of what can be seen in copies of the work, which show "a diligent character".

The dating of the work fluctuates widely, depending on the researcher. Vincent Delieuvin, for example, estimates it to be "around 1502–1503", i.e. at the very beginning of the painting's creation. The drawings would thus be a study for the initial painting: the technique of drawing with red chalk on a red preparation used for the studies of The Last Supper (1495–1498) or The Madonna of the Yarnwinder (circa 1501) and typical of this period thus provides an important indication. For his part, Carlo Pedretti suggests "1510–1511". Carmen C. Bambach places it "circa 1508–1510", using exactly the same argument as Vincent Delieuvin, but relying on later works that use this technique with "a much more graduated tonal scale and surface quality". Nevertheless, Vincent Delieuvin adds in his reasoning that the studies have a "very preliminary character", which can be cross-referenced with the fact that the painting was started as early as 1503. As a result of this uncertainty, some researchers, such as Frank Zöllner, propose a very broad and question-ridden dating: "circa 1501–1510 (?)".

=== Progress of the work ===
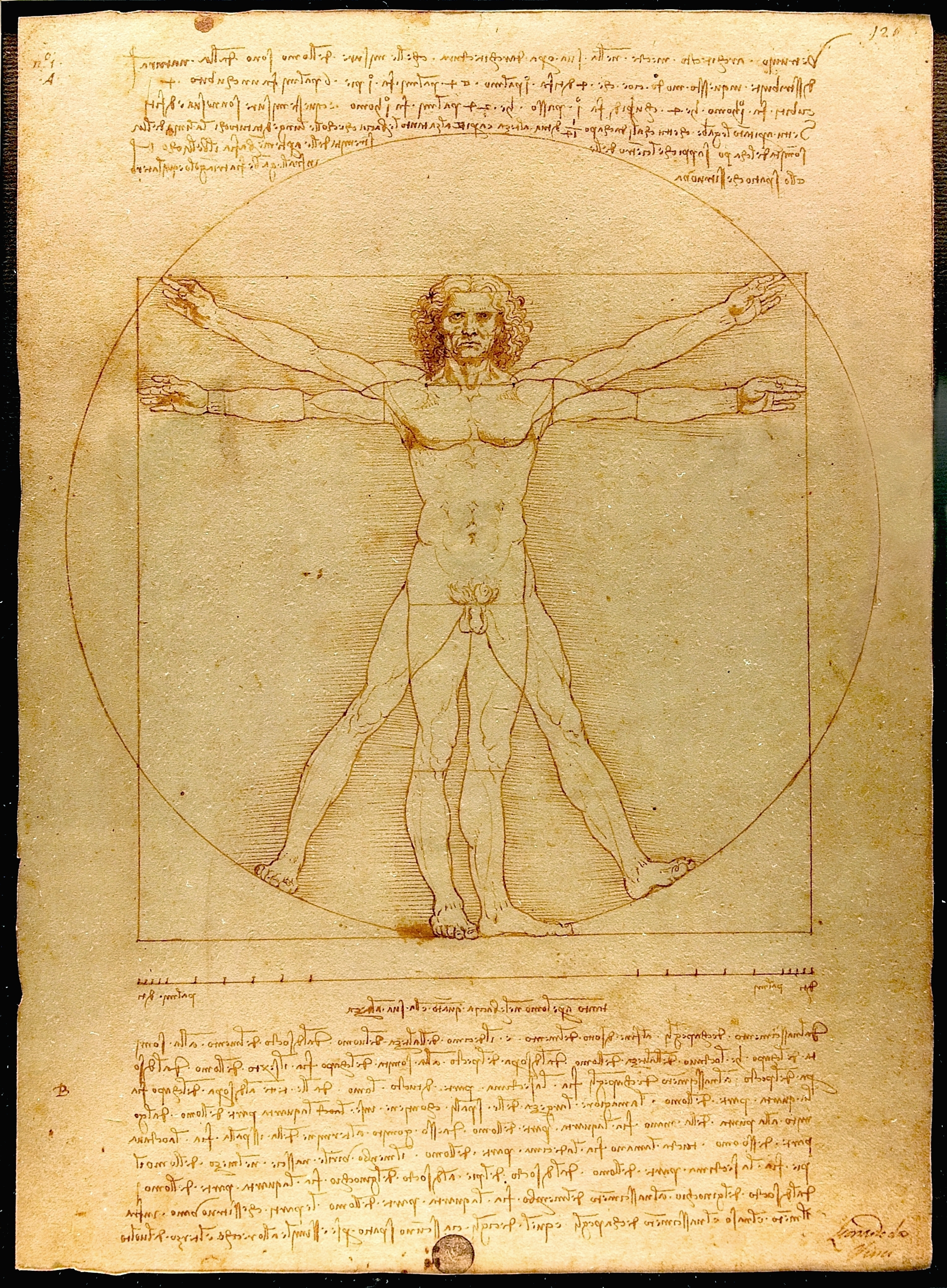
Vitruvian Man (1490, Venice)

It is only recently that it has been able to determine how the work progressed after its creation. Listed in the drawing collection of Cardinal Cesare Monti (1594–1650) between 1635 and 1650, along with other works such as Vitruvian Man, it remained in the family until 1770, when one of its distant heirs, Countess Anna Luisa Monti, purchased it. Venanzio De Pagave (1722–1803) purchased it to build up a collection of drawings, engravings and paintings. By inheritance, he bequeathed the collection to his son Gaudenzio De Pagave, who, around 1807–1808, sold it for 200 gold louis to the Italian art historian and painter Giuseppe Bossi. A great admirer of Leonardo da Vinci, Bossi wished to build up a collection of the painter's works, and had noted in his diary a short time earlier: "Having come into contact with old drawings has rekindled in me the desire to own the collection of the late Venanzio De Pagave, then of his son Gaudenzio. This morning I wrote him a note urging him once again that I was prepared to make any sacrifice to obtain it. The Studies of an Infant drawings are kept in an album marked "K". After the painter's death in 1815, the drawing was included in the "Bossi sale" held in Milan in February 1818. On February 24, it was purchased with the rest of the collection by Abbé Luigi Celotti. It remained in the custody of Carlo Porta and Nicola Cassoni at the Academy of Fine Arts of Brera until 1822, as part of the "Luigi Celotti Collection". As early as 1820, it was the subject of a proposal to purchase it with the rest of the collection by the Austrian government on behalf of the Academy of Fine Arts of Venice. Finally, in 1822, it was purchased by the Austrian Emperor Francis I for the Academy of Fine Arts in Venice and transferred to its galleries, where it has remained ever since.

== Creation ==
=== A study for The Virgin and Child with Saint Anne ===
The Studies of an Infant are universally recognized as a preparatory study for the Infant depicted in the painting The Virgin and Child with Saint Anne in the Louvre.

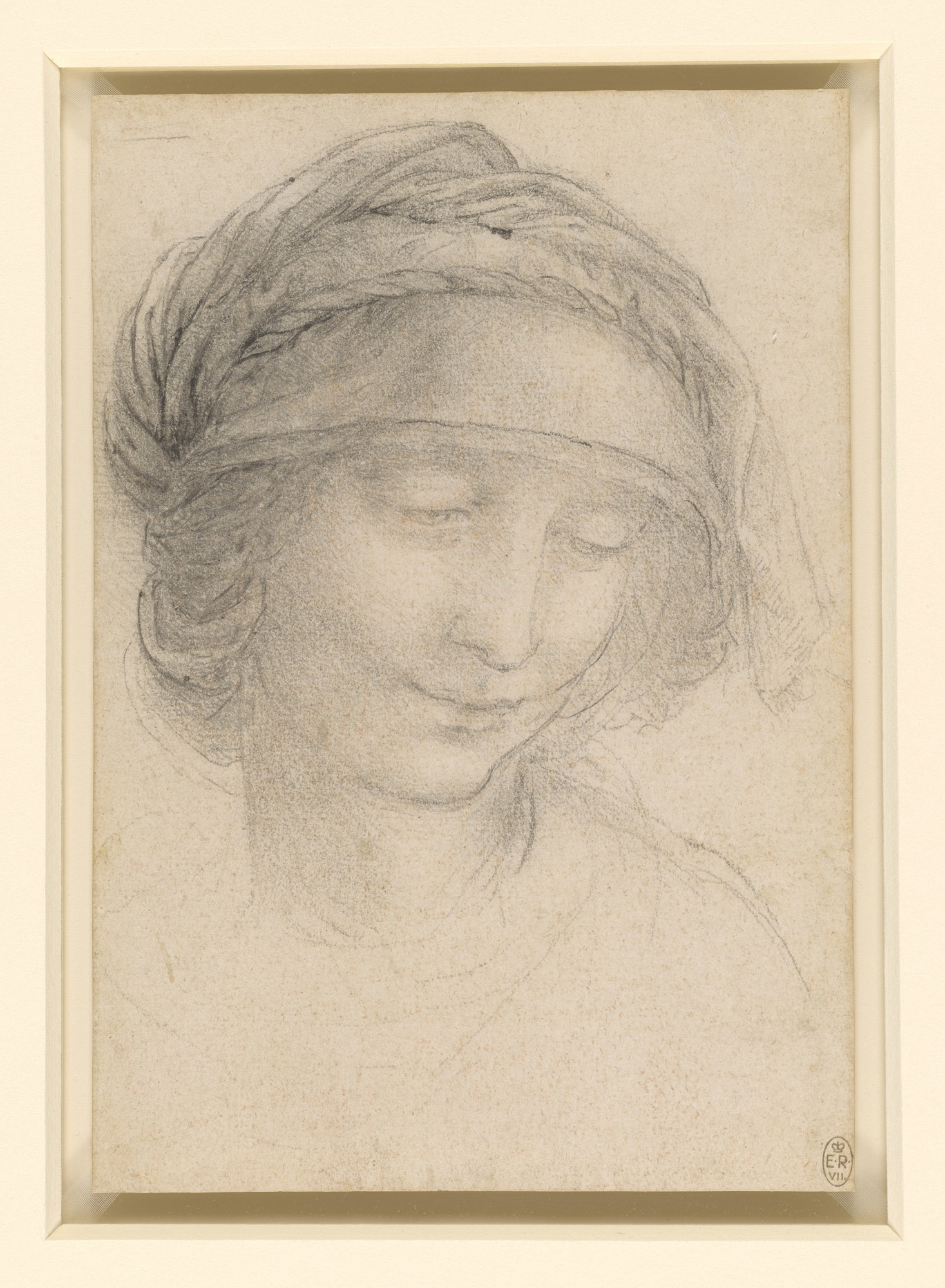
Another contemporary preparatory drawing for the Studies of an Infant: Study of Saint Anne's head, circa 1502–1503, United Kingdom, Windsor Castle)

According to Vincent Delieuvin, it belongs to a group of three drawings dedicated to the Infant Jesus: the group derives its coherence from the "red on red" technique applied to each of them, and from the fact that "these are the only drawings that are not precise, finished studies of a detail of the composition, used for immediate transposition into the painting". In addition to The Studies of an Infant drawings, there is a study for Jesus’ right leg, also in the Gallerie dell'Accademia in Venice (inv. no. 217), and another for his bust in Windsor Castle (inv. no. RCIN 912538). With regard to the latter work, although he concedes that it appears to present an older child than the baby visible in the painting, Vincent Delieuvin justifies its status as a study of the Infant by the fact that he sees the same leftward rotation applied to the barely sketched head as on the sheet of Studies of an Infant and on the painting in the Louvre. While Frank Zöllner and Johannes Nathan deny it the status of a study, the Royal Collection Trust, owner of the work, seems to grant it this status, despite a divergent dating by Vincent Delieuvin.

One of a series of studies of the Infant for Saint Anne.

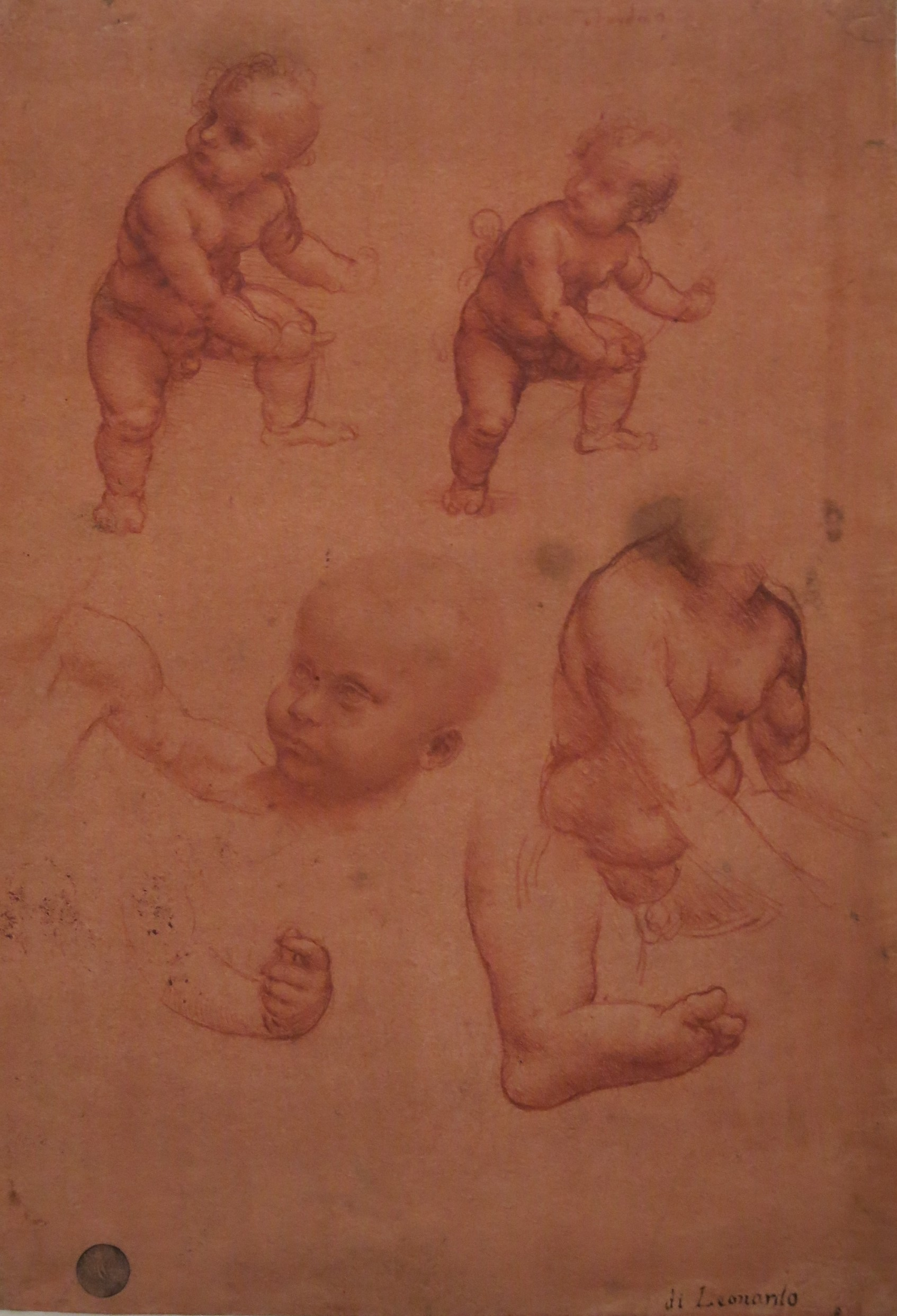
Studies of an Infant (1502-1503) in Venice, Gallerie dell'Accademia

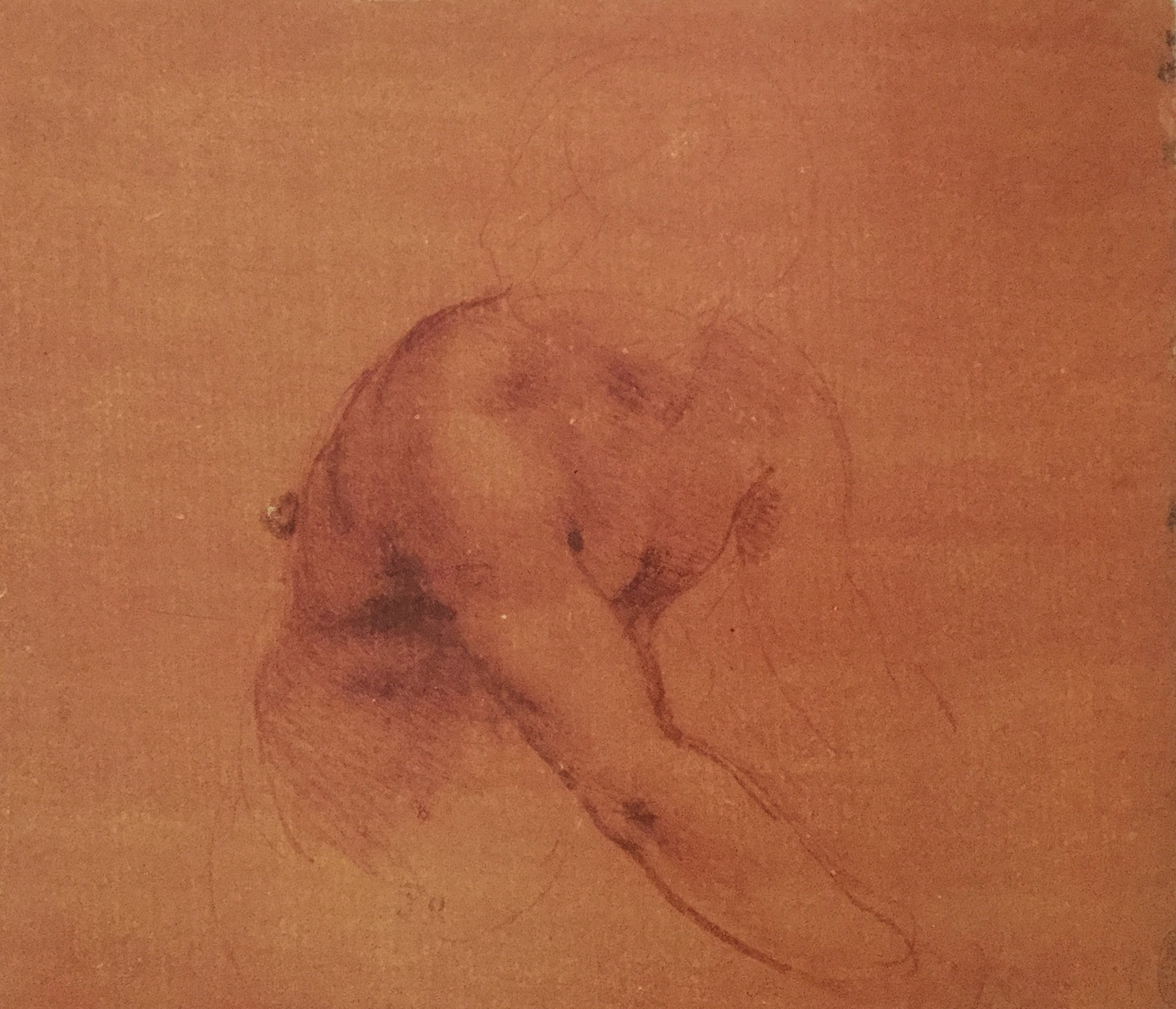
A presumed Study of the Torso of the Infant (1502-1503 or circa 1511) at Windsor Castle

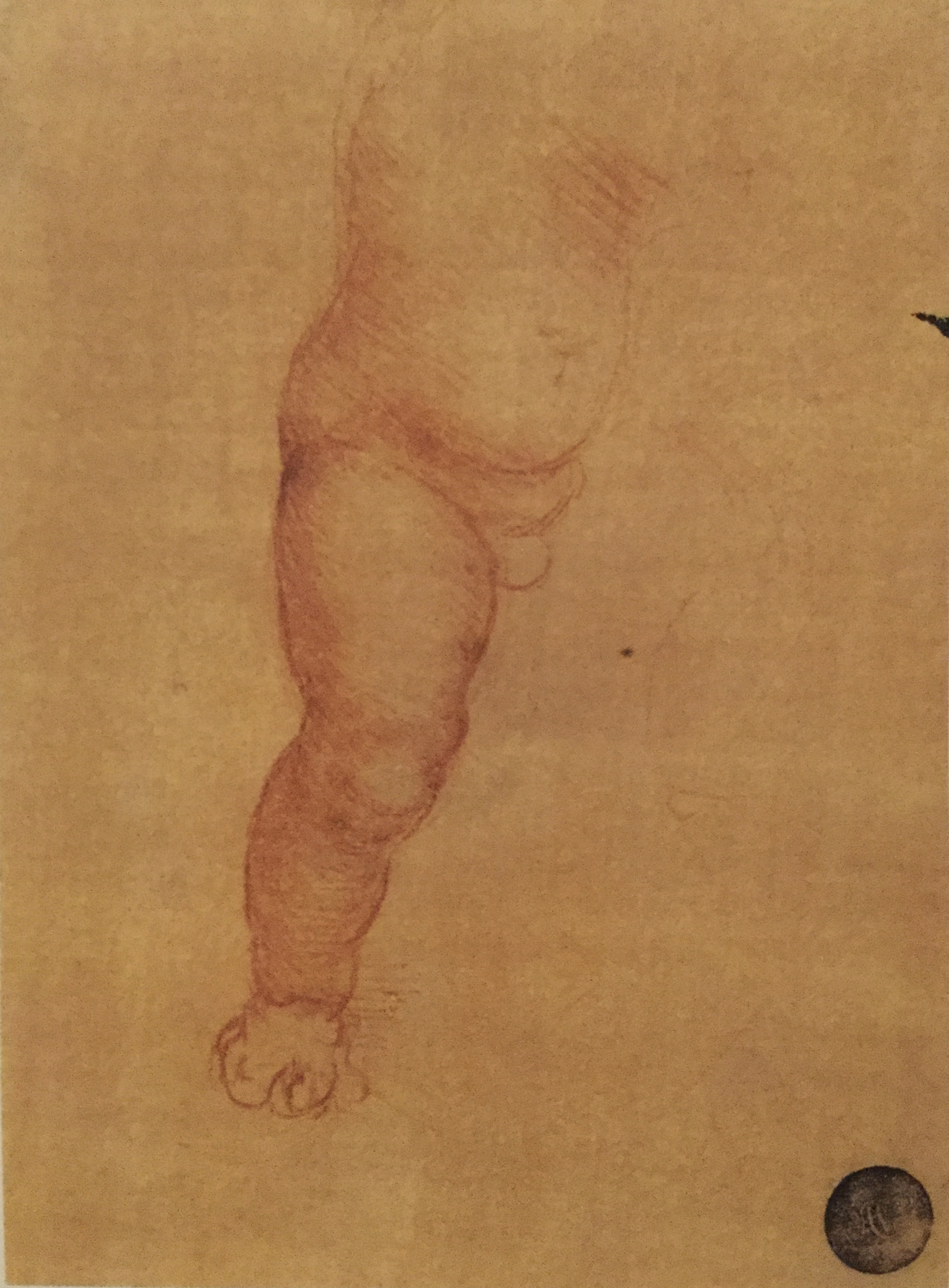
Study for the Infant's leg (1502-1503) in Venice, Gallerie dell'Accademia

Two types of study relate directly to the painting of The Virgin and Child with Saint Anne: those that enabled the creation of the draft, and those that constitute "the final changes decided by the master" and are therefore the furthest removed in time from it. With its exclusive use of red chalk on red preparation, so characteristic of Leonardo da Vinci's style at the beginning of the century, the drawing belongs firmly in the first group.

Comparison of the study

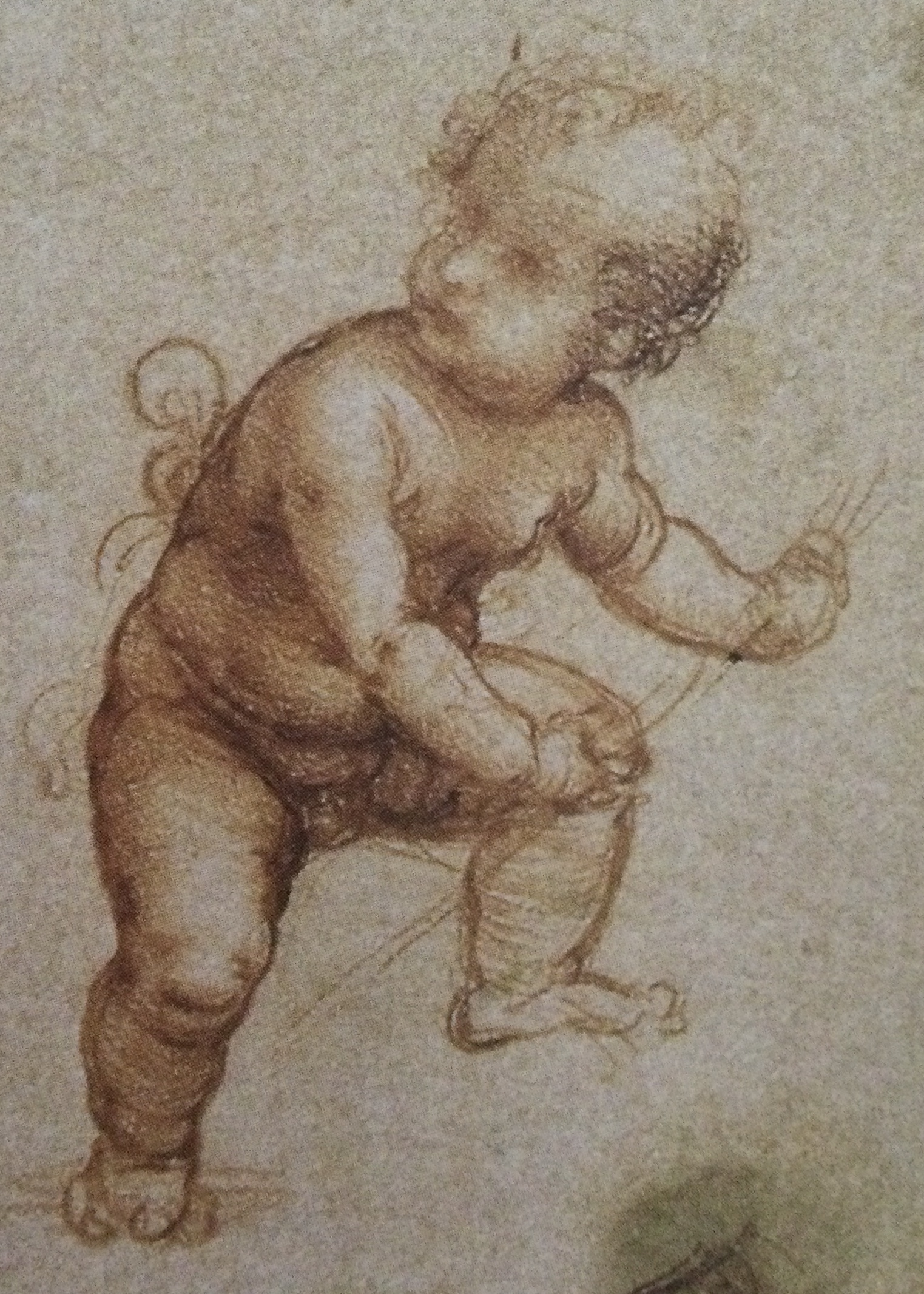
Studies of an Infant (detail on the drawing at top left)

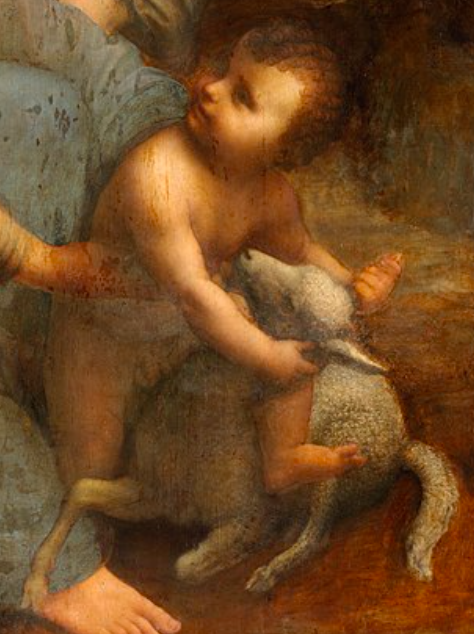
The virgin and Child with Saint Anne (detail, 1503-1519, Paris, Musée du Louvre)

=== The creative process ===
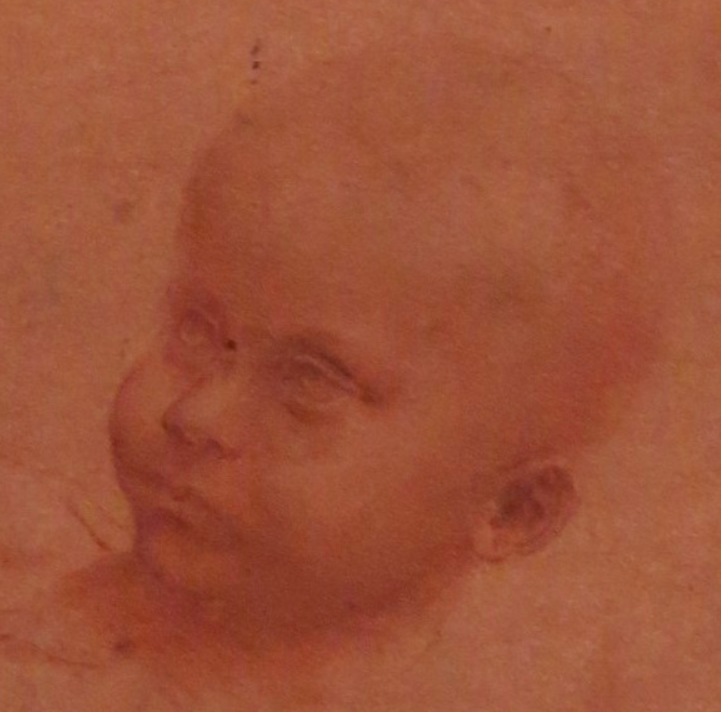
Detail on the center of the drawing

Leonardo da Vinci begins by rubbing red chalk onto the paper. His pencil sketch is made with the same material. The choice of this technique, known as "red on red", stems from specific needs: this tone-on-tone technique has the advantage of taking into account the intermediate shading in which the small figure finds himself – as opposed to the Virgin, who is much more illuminated – by reducing the contrast between form and background; moreover, this technique saves time for an artist in research, since it immediately allows him to obtain "subtle contrasts of light and shadow, whereas black stone on white paper would have required more careful blurring".

Leonardo da Vinci began his research with the drawing at top right. He appears to be working from life, using the services of a model, as evidenced by the fact that the Infant is holding a stick (instead of a lamb) as the model would have done in the studio. This hypothesis is confirmed by the perception that the figure in the Windsor Castle drawing (inv. no. RCIN 912538 and belonging to the same research series) is older than it should be. As for the study at top left, it is the one that changed the most during the development of the series: while its general composition has remained the same, it is the angle of inclination of certain parts of its body that has changed. It is this arrangement that the painter uses in the final painting. Along with the head, these two drawings of the whole baby are the most finished: the painter even chose to perfect them with a light highlight of white gouache.

The central drawing, representing the Infant’s head, has a particular aspect within the sheet, due to the finish and smoothness it offers; this has even contributed to casting doubt on the autograph nature of the entire sheet. In fact, the painter proposes an "expressive and highly innovative experimental technique". The artist began by tracing the outline of his drawing with fine chalk strokes. Then he created the first shading effects with light hatching and dry matter blending; next, he applied a wet red chalk wash to smooth the transitions between light and shadow. He completed his undertaking by applying touches of white gouache to small areas of the forehead, nose and cheekbones, to give a slight glow to the brightest areas.

== Analysis ==
=== The application of great technical experience ===
The series of studies on the Gallerie dell'Accademia bears witness to Leonardo da Vinci's great experience as a painter, but also as an observer of nature and an anatomist. His artistic experience is reflected in the technical choice of tone-on-tone representation, and contributes to a result so notable – in contradiction with the work's status as a study – that it may have contributed to casting doubt on the autograph nature of the sheet. His research into the phenomena associated with the effect of light and its translation in terms of the rendering of light and shadow are apparent in the accurate use of tonal variations, notably on the head in the center of the sheet. His anatomical knowledge also enables him to accurately reproduce, on the torso in the center left, for example, the effects of a slightly adipose skin visible on the figure's right shoulder, arm and chest. Finally, the same knowledge is evident in the work around the right leg – though destined to disappear behind that of the Virgin – carried out to find the most realistic position for the balance of this body in motion.

=== The baby theme ===
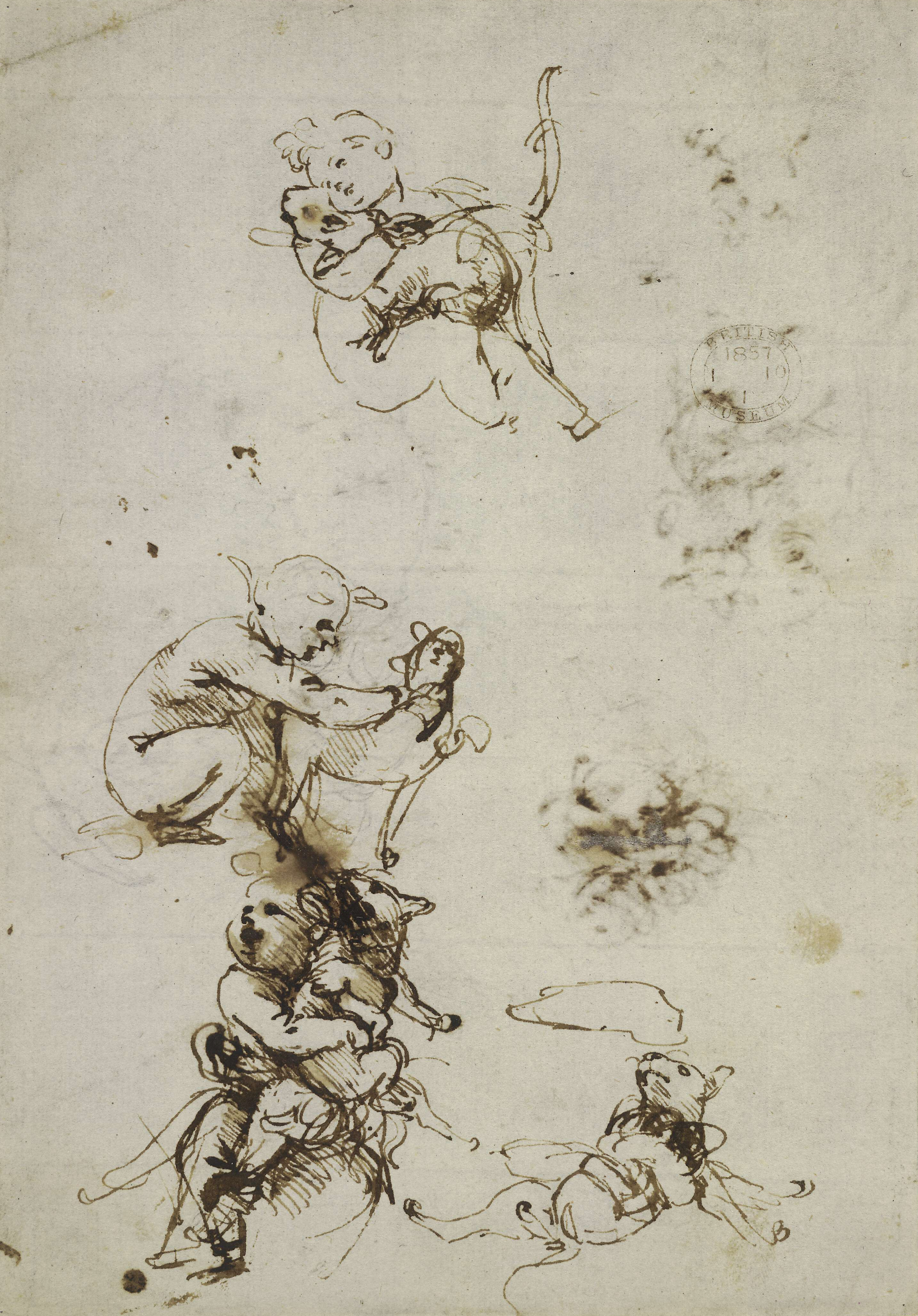
Leonardo da Vinci, Trois croquis d'un enfant avec un chat (1478–1481) in London, British Museum

When Leonardo da Vinci created his Studies of an Infant series of drawings around 1502–1503, he had already been depicting the figure of a child for some time. In fact, drawing babies was one of the themes he explored from his early days in Florence to the end of his life in France. There is a link between the painter's apprenticeship in life drawing when he started out with his master Verrocchio, drawings such as the Trois croquis d'un enfant avec un chat (Three Sketches of a Child with a Cat) dating from 1478–1481 and, thirty years later, the studies leading up to Saint Anne. In this vein, Peter Hohenstatt explains: "Since neither children nor cats know how to pose and remain motionless, Leonardo here demonstrates his talent for observation and his ability to discern decisive moments while quickly noting them down. These studies show how the painter progressively elaborates his work and sharpens his gift for observation to obtain more life and naturalness in his paintings".

== Posterity ==
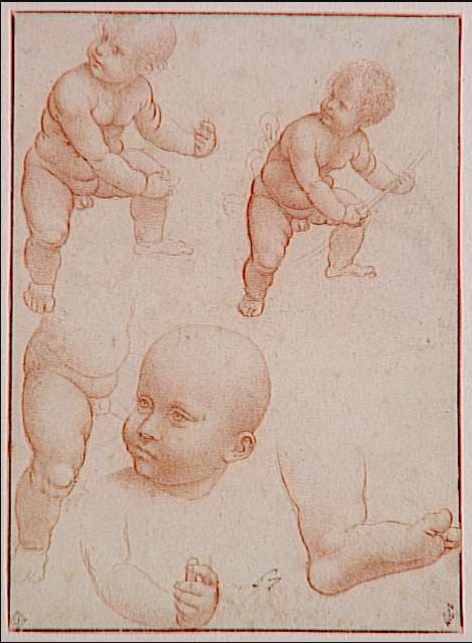
Leonardo da Vinci workshop, Copy of the Studies of an Infant (between 1502 and 1510) Chantilly, Musée Condé

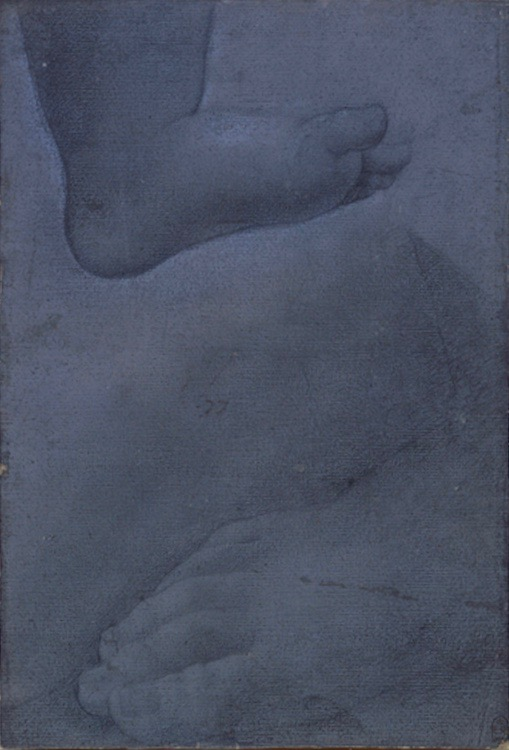
Leonardo da Vinci, Left foot of an Infant and right foot of Saint Anne (1516-1519) at Windsor Castle

The Studies of an Infant drawings was copied several times by Leonardo da Vinci's followers. The best-known is in the Musée Condé in Chantilly, which some scholars have in the past considered to be in the master's hand. Because of its scrupulous application – a far cry from the freer stroke of its model – and the traces of deferment it contains, it is now attributed to one of his pupils, in the words of Carmen C. Bambach: "The unwritten rule is that the work must have been done by the master. Bambach: "The unwritten rule is that when a Leonardo drawing is too licked, it should be given to a pupil". His interest lies in the fact that, in addition to the drawings, it also includes the Study for the Infant’s Leg (also conserved in Venice under no. inv. 217), reinforcing the link between the two works. Last but not least, Windsor Castle holds a document dated circa 1516–1519, which includes a representation of the Infant’s foot and whose "technique resembles [a] late drawing by Leonardo", but which stands out for its mediocre technique.

== See also ==
- List of works by Leonardo da Vinci

== Bibliography ==
- Bambach, Carmen (2003). "Entries". Leonardo da Vinci, master draftsman. Yale University Press. ISBN 978-1-5883-9034-9.
- Bramly, Serge (2019). Léonard de Vinci : Une biographie. Essais et documents (in French). Jean-Claude Lattès. ISBN 978-2-7096-6323-6.
- Delieuvin, Vincent (2012). La Sainte Anne : l'ultime chef-d'œuvre de léonard de Vinci (in French). Louvre éditions. ISBN 978-2-35031-370-2.
- Delieuvin, Vincent (2019). "Mélancolie et joie". Léonard de Vinci (in French). Louvre éditions. ISBN 978-2-7541-1123-2.
- Zöllner, Frank; Nathan, Johannes (2016). Léonard de Vinci, 1452–1519 : L'œuvre graphique. Bibliotheca universalis. Taschen. ISBN 978-3-8365-5440-4.
- Zöllner, Frank (2017). Léonard de Vinci, 1452–1519 : Tout l'œuvre peint. Bibliotheca universalis (in French). Taschen. ISBN 978-3-8365-6296-6.
