= Virgin and Child with Saint Anne =

Subject in Christian art

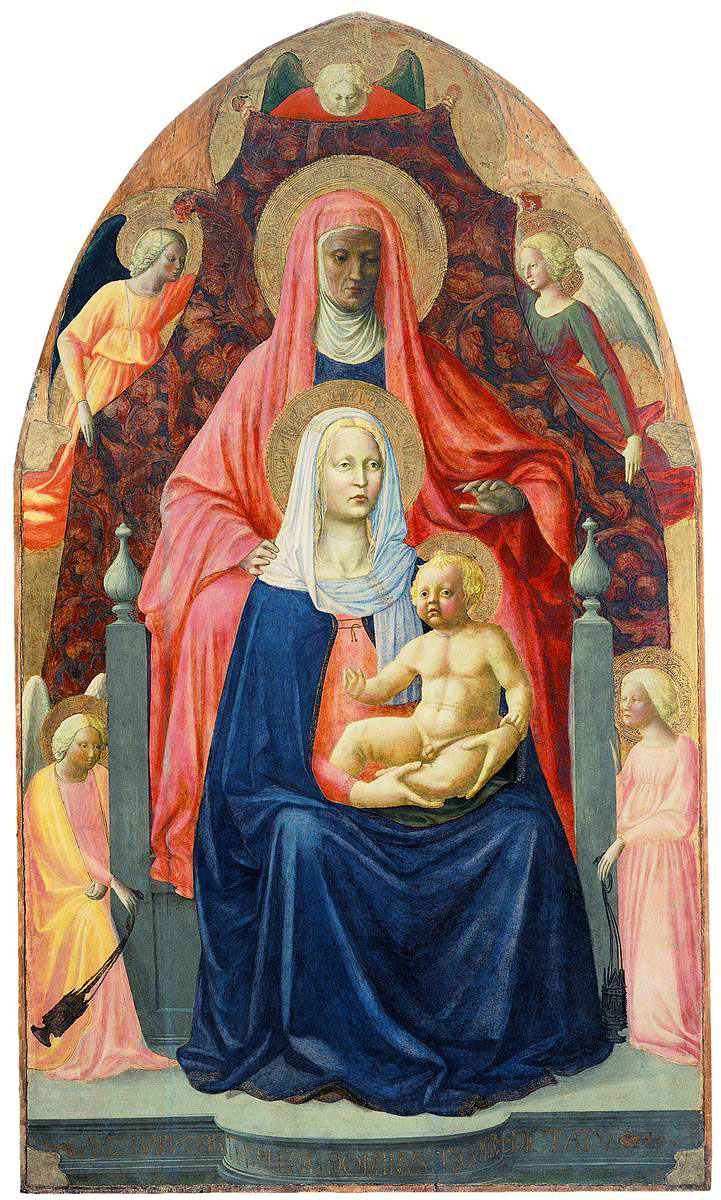
Masolino and Masaccio, Virgin and Child with Saint Anne (c. 1424), Uffizi

The Virgin and Child with Saint Anne or Madonna and Child with Saint Anne is a subject in Christian art showing Saint Anne with her daughter, the Virgin Mary, and her grandson Jesus. This depiction has been popular in Germany and neighboring countries since the 14th century.

== Names ==
Names for this particular subject in other languages include:

- Dutch: Anna te drieën
- French: Anne trinitaire
- German: Anna selbdritt
- Italian: Anna Metterza
- Polish: Święta Anna samotrzecia
- Slovene: Ana Samotretja

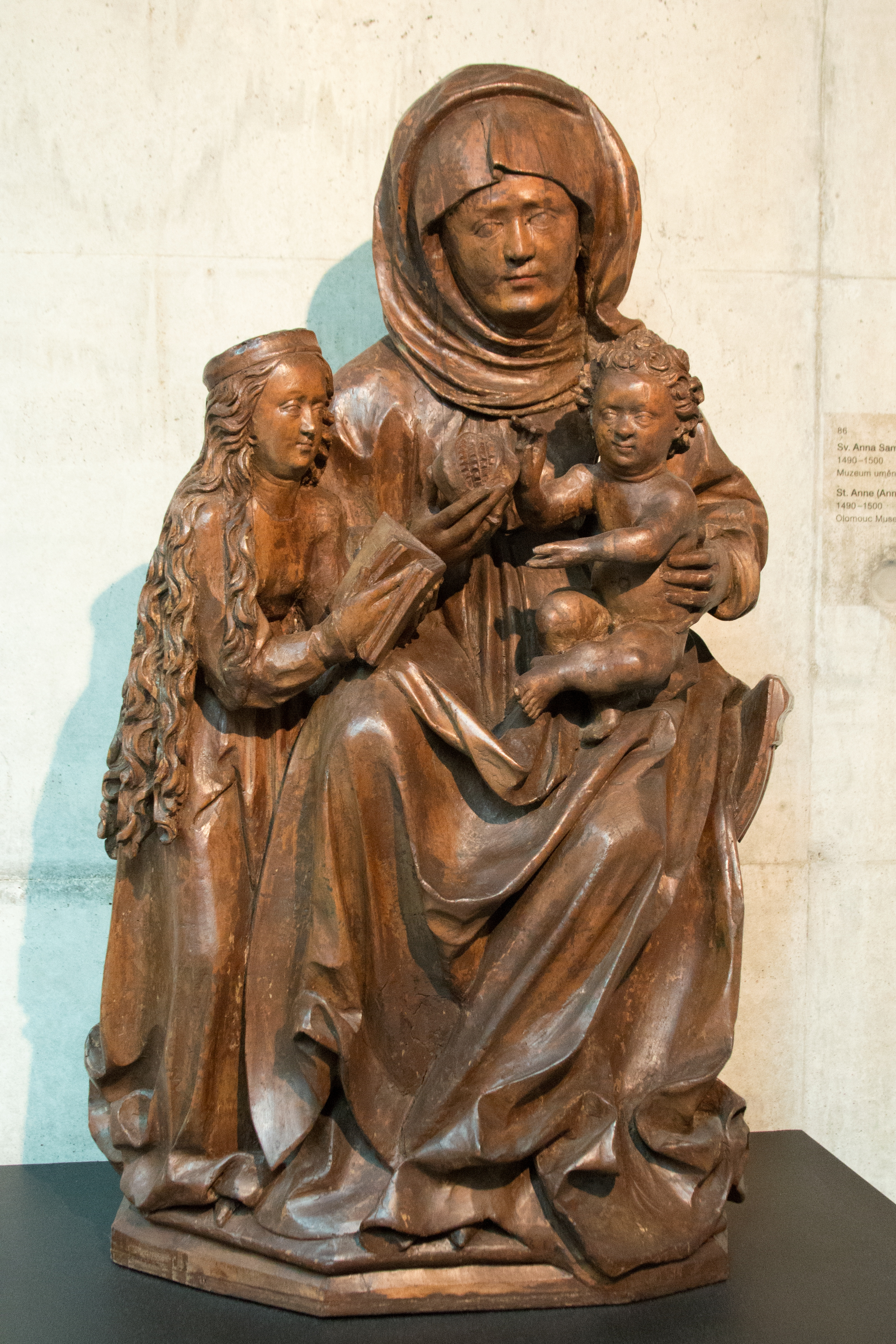
Anna Samotřetí, Czech, 1490-1500, museum in Olomouc

== Background ==
In the 13th century, Jacobus de Voragine incorporated apocryphal accounts from the Protoevangelium of James regarding the parents of the Blessed Virgin Mary in his Golden Legend. The cult of St. Anne spread rapidly and she became one of the most popular saints of the Latin Church. Saint Anne was recognized as the patroness of grandparents, women in labor, and of miners, Christ being compared to gold, and Mary to silver. Inscriptions on some medieval church bells indicate that Saint Anne was invoked for protection against thunderstorms.

== Mother and daughter ==
The subject of Saint Anne and the Virgin and Child was a popular subject in both painting and sculpture. This was due in part to its universality "—the love and tension between generations and also between humanity and the divine." In the 1500s the theme became popular in Germany (Anna selbdritt) and Italy (Metterza) demonstrating the upcoming emphasis on the humanity of Jesus. St. Anne's motherhood of Mary was viewed as mirroring her daughter's motherhood of Jesus. In 1497, the German Benedictine abbot Johannes Trithemius, in his De purissima et immaculate conception virginis Marie et de festivitate sancta Annematris eius linked the Immaculate Conception of Mary to the devotion to her mother. While the matter of the Immaculate Conception remained a subject of debate among philosophers and theologians, the depiction of Joachim and Anne Meeting at the Golden Gate was sometimes interpreted as a symbolic representation of the conception of Mary. Saint Anne was revered as the avia Christi ("grandmother of Christ"), matriarch of the Holy Kinship and exemplary mother.

== Iconography ==
Fourteenth-century images of Saint Anne with the Virgin and Child were often modeled on the earlier seat of Wisdom motif. Mary was often shown as a much smaller figure than her mother. As devotion to St. Anne developed 14th century, sometimes a statue of the Madonna and Child was modified to include the additional figure of St. Anne. Anne's traditional colors are green and red, although often she is shown wearing the more sober colors of an older woman.

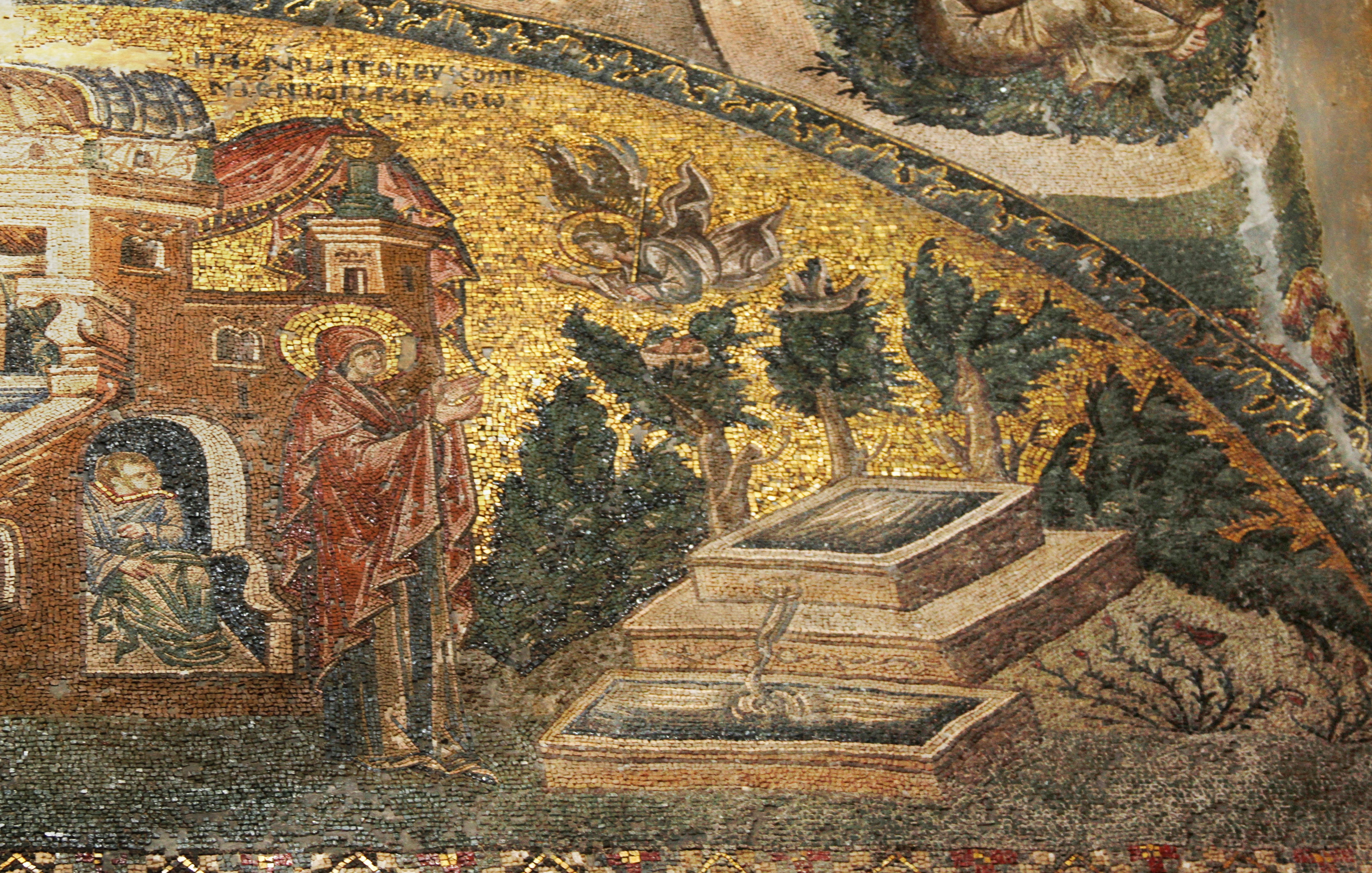
Annunciation to Saint Anne (with a reclining Joachim at the top right), 11th-century mosaic, Chora Church, Istanbul

== Byzantine iconography ==
Eastern depictions of the apocryphal narrative mimic the scriptural account of the Annunciation of the Archangel Gabriel to Mary and take the form of a reclining Agios Joachim beside a double-vesicled fountain or well, implying Mary's perpetual virginity flows from the mystery of her Immaculate Conception in the womb of her mother Agia Anna in linear fashion conform with Eastern creedal statements on the procession of the Holy Spirit. Absent modern meteorology, and therefore the scientific knowledge of how surface water is replenished naturally by atmospheric moisture, the early Christian artist was limited by linear symbolism of gravity known in the topography of the region. Dewfall and the phenomenon of manna in the desert would have been known but revered as ineffable.

== Depictions ==
Italian Renaissance painter Masaccio took up the subject around 1424. Leonardo da Vinci did an oil painting on this theme for the Church of Santissima Annunziata in Florence. Albrecht Dürer made an oil painting on wood around 1519 on the same subject. The Art Institute of Chicago has a version of Bartholomäus Bruyn the Elder who painted the group with the donor and his patron Saint Gereon around 1520.

Around 1606 Caravaggio undertook a commission from the Confraternity of Sant' Anna dei Palafrenieri. He depicted the Virgin and Child treading on the head of the serpent, observed by St. Anne, who was the patron saint of the Palafrenieri.

== Gallery ==
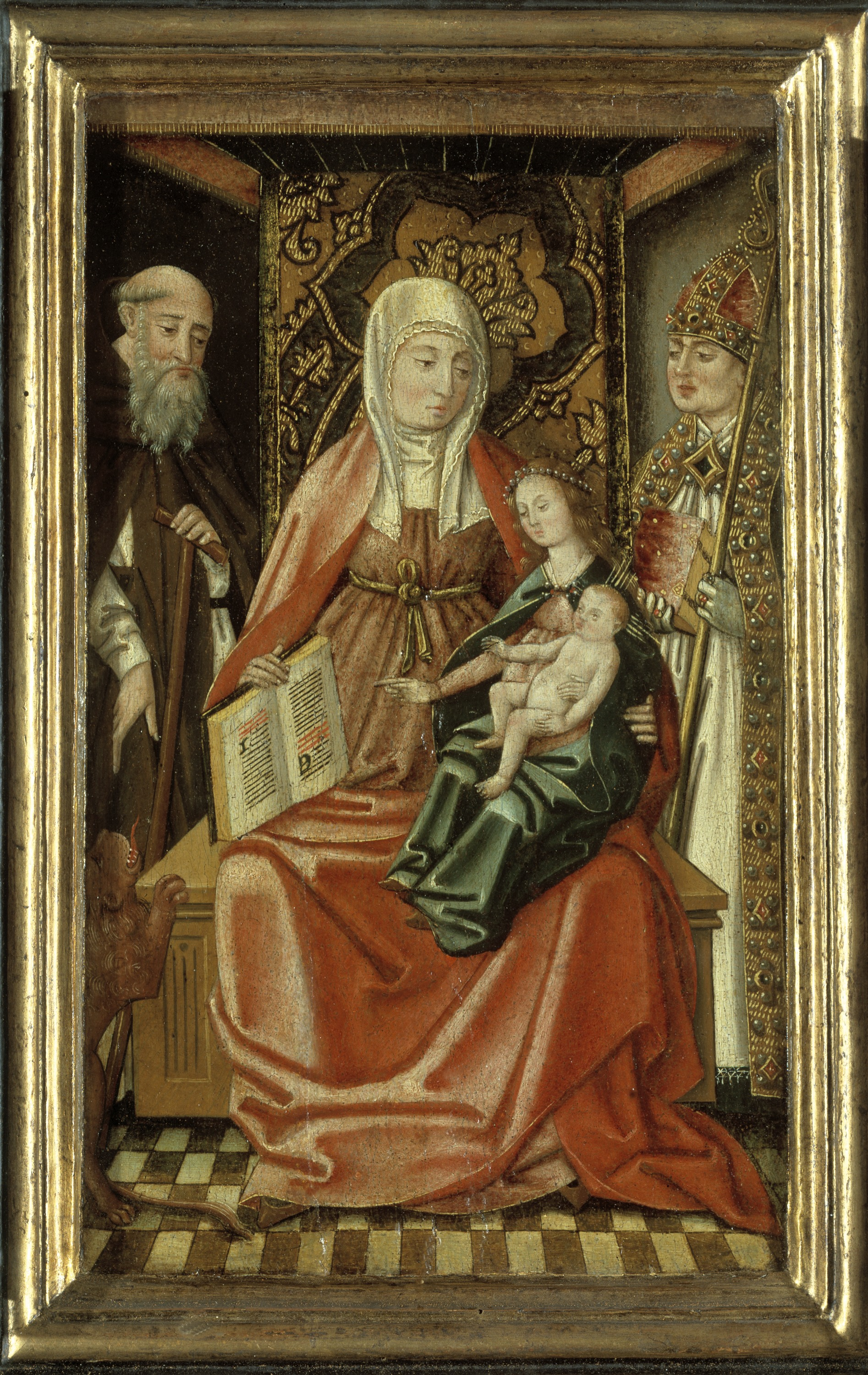
Spanish, c. 1400–1425, Smithsonian American Art Museum, Washington

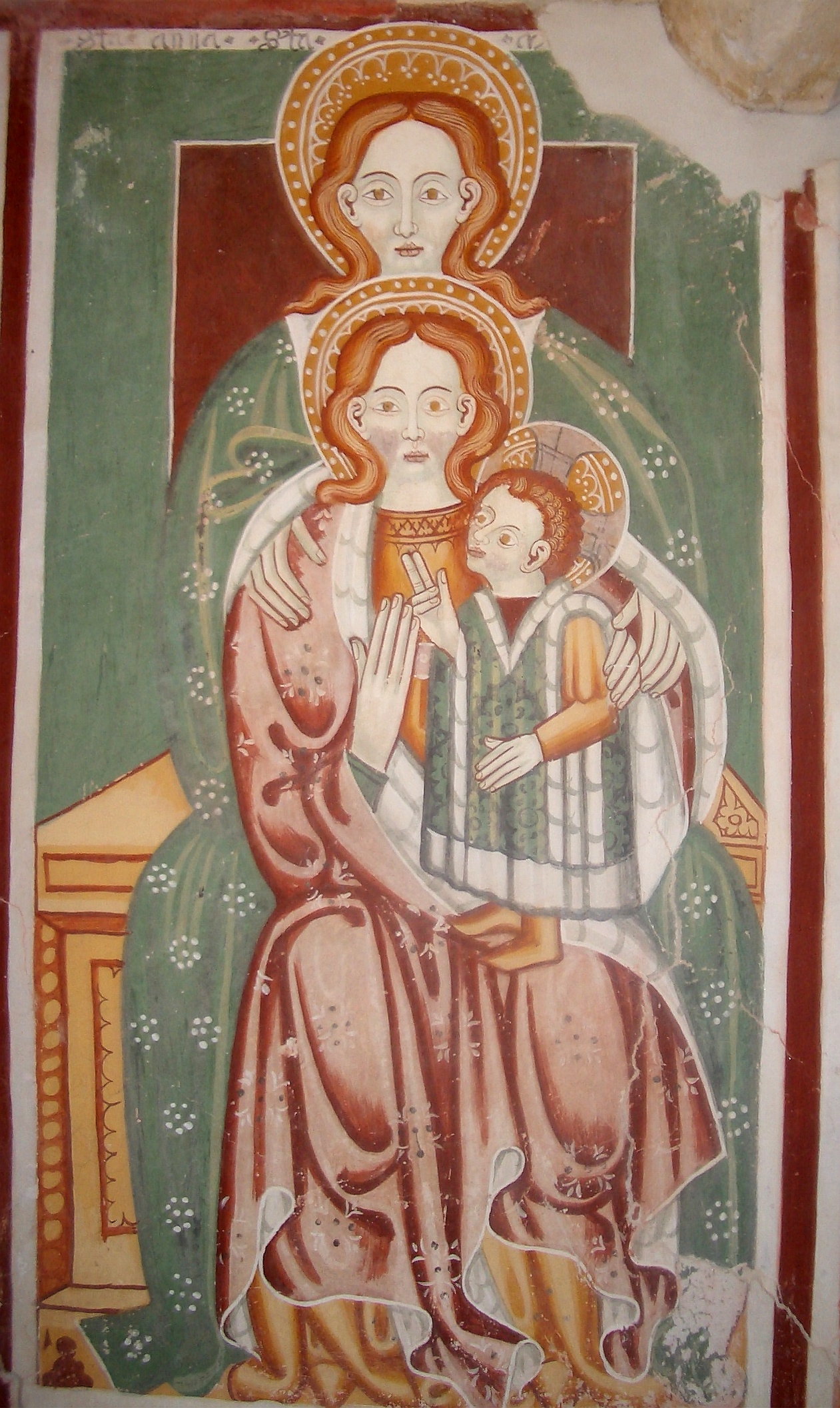
Santa Anna Metterza, fresco, Oratorio di San Lorenzo all'alpe Seccio, Boccioleto (Piedmont), c. 1450

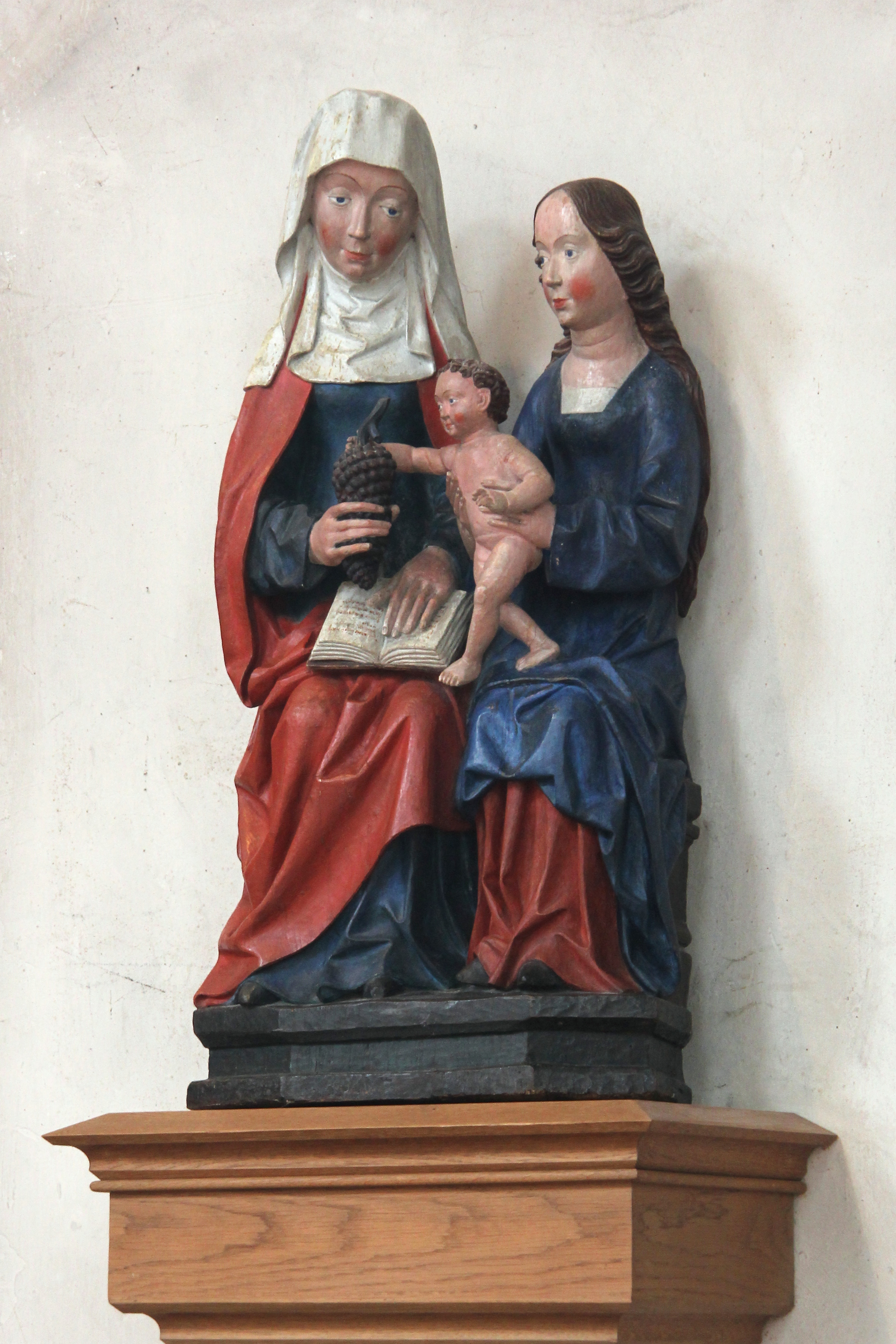
Anna selbdritt, Wehr (Eifel), c. 1450

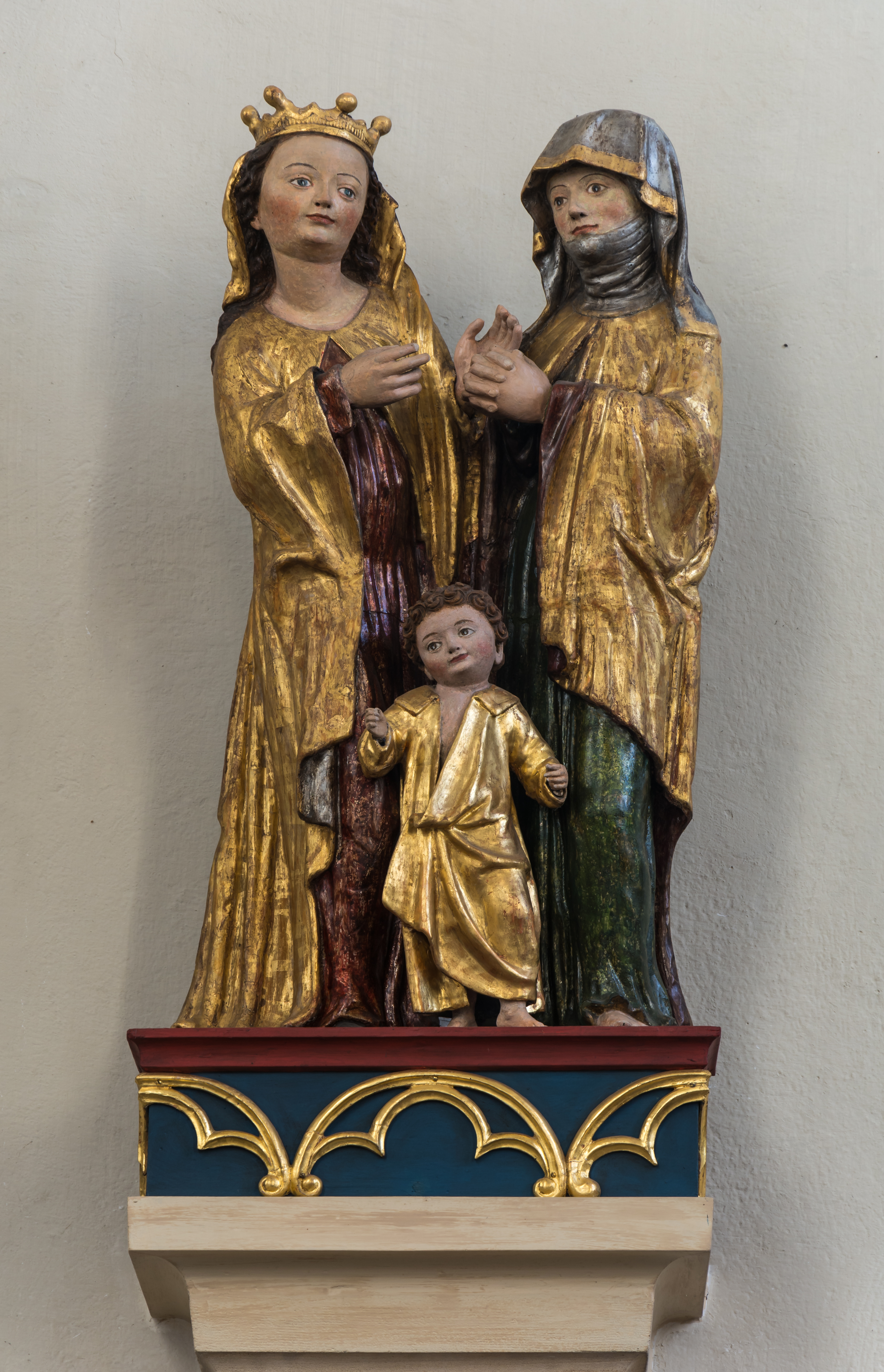
Anna selbdritt, Lower Austria, 1480

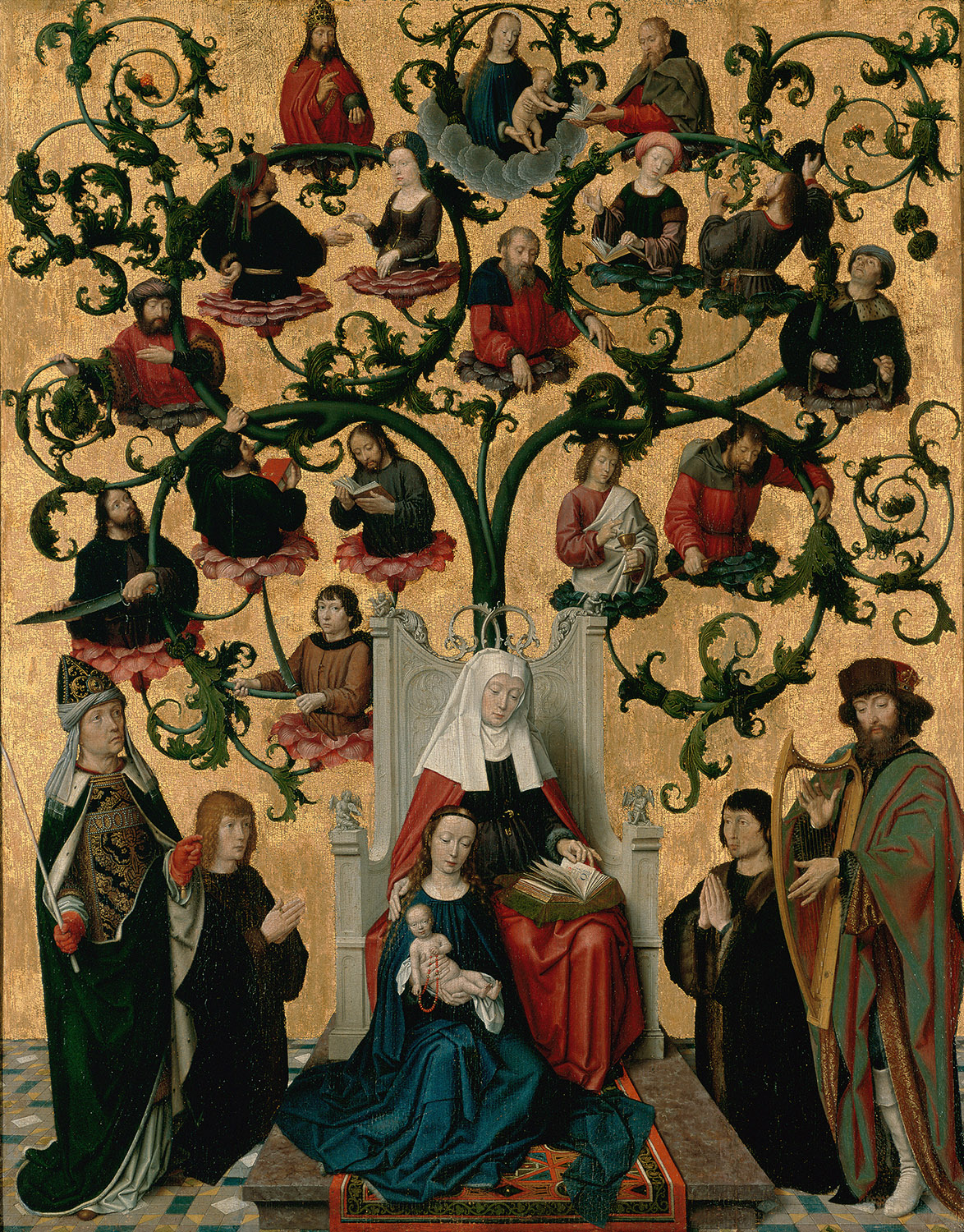
The Line of Saint Anne, Gérard David, c. 1500, Musée des Beaux-Arts de Lyon

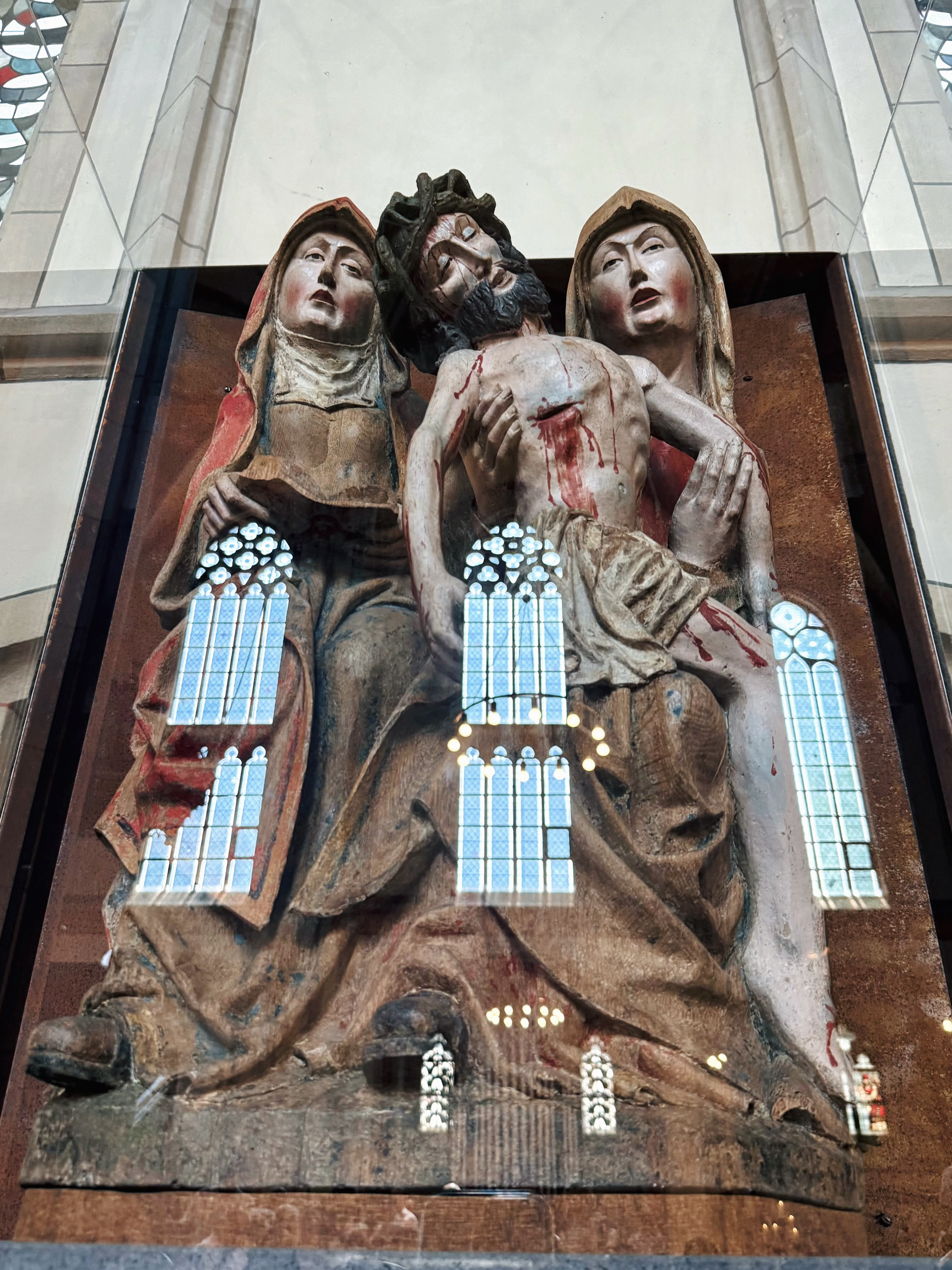
Historically unique fusion of Anna selbdritt and Vesperbild (Pietà) in St. Michael, Schwalmtal, c. 1500

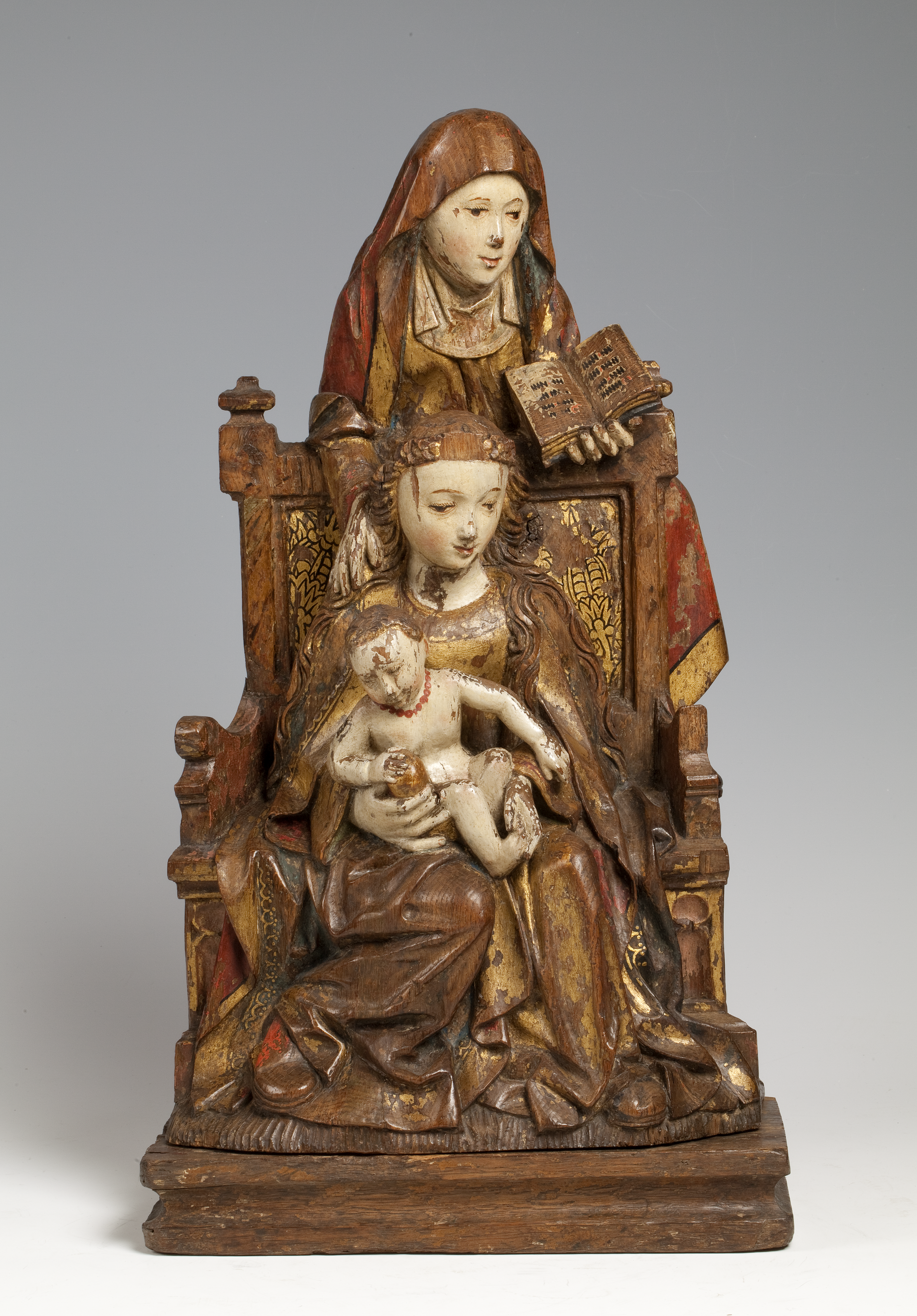
Anna-te-Drieën, northern Netherlands, c. 1495–1504, Museum Catharijneconvent, Utrecht

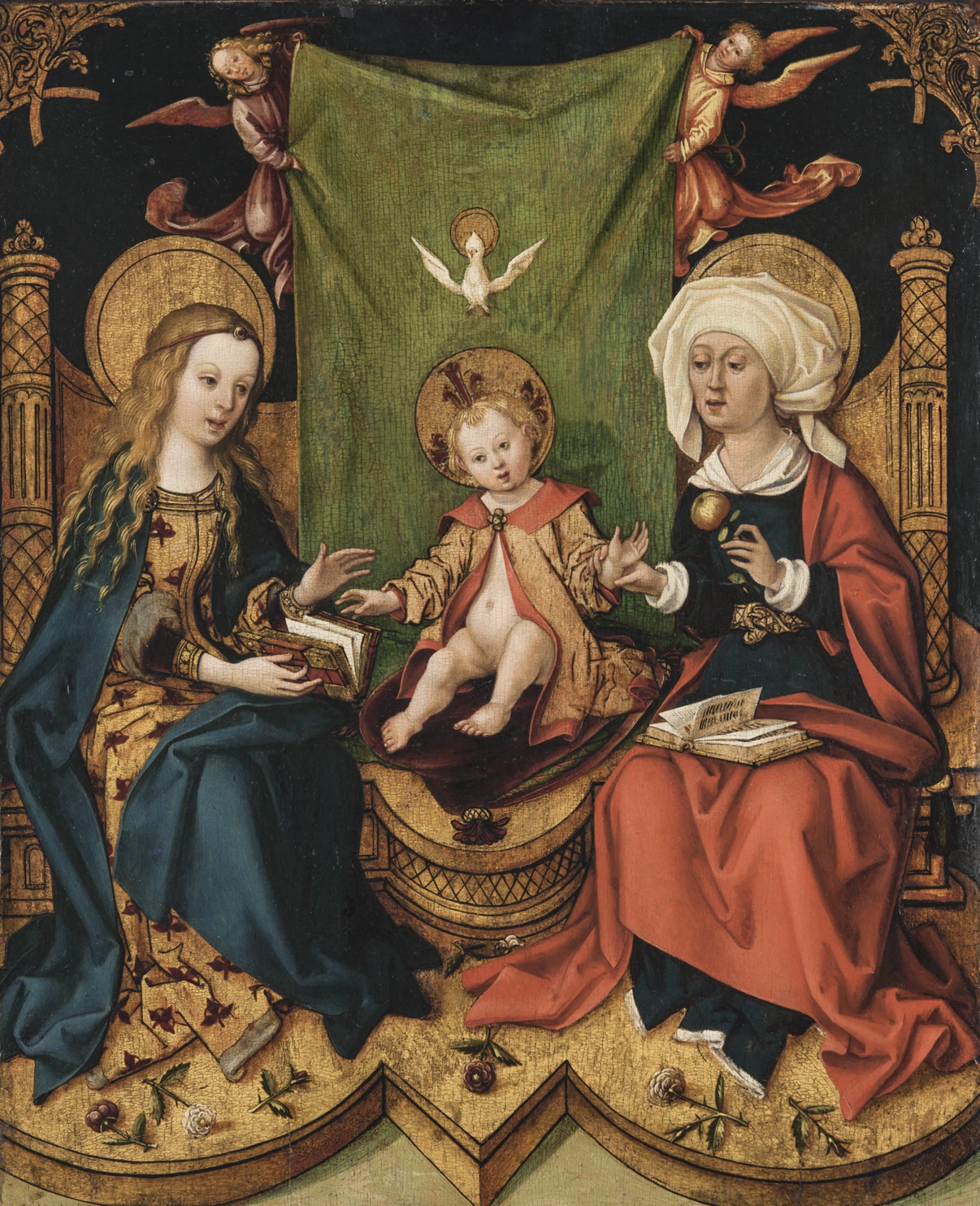
Hans Holbein the Elder († 1524)

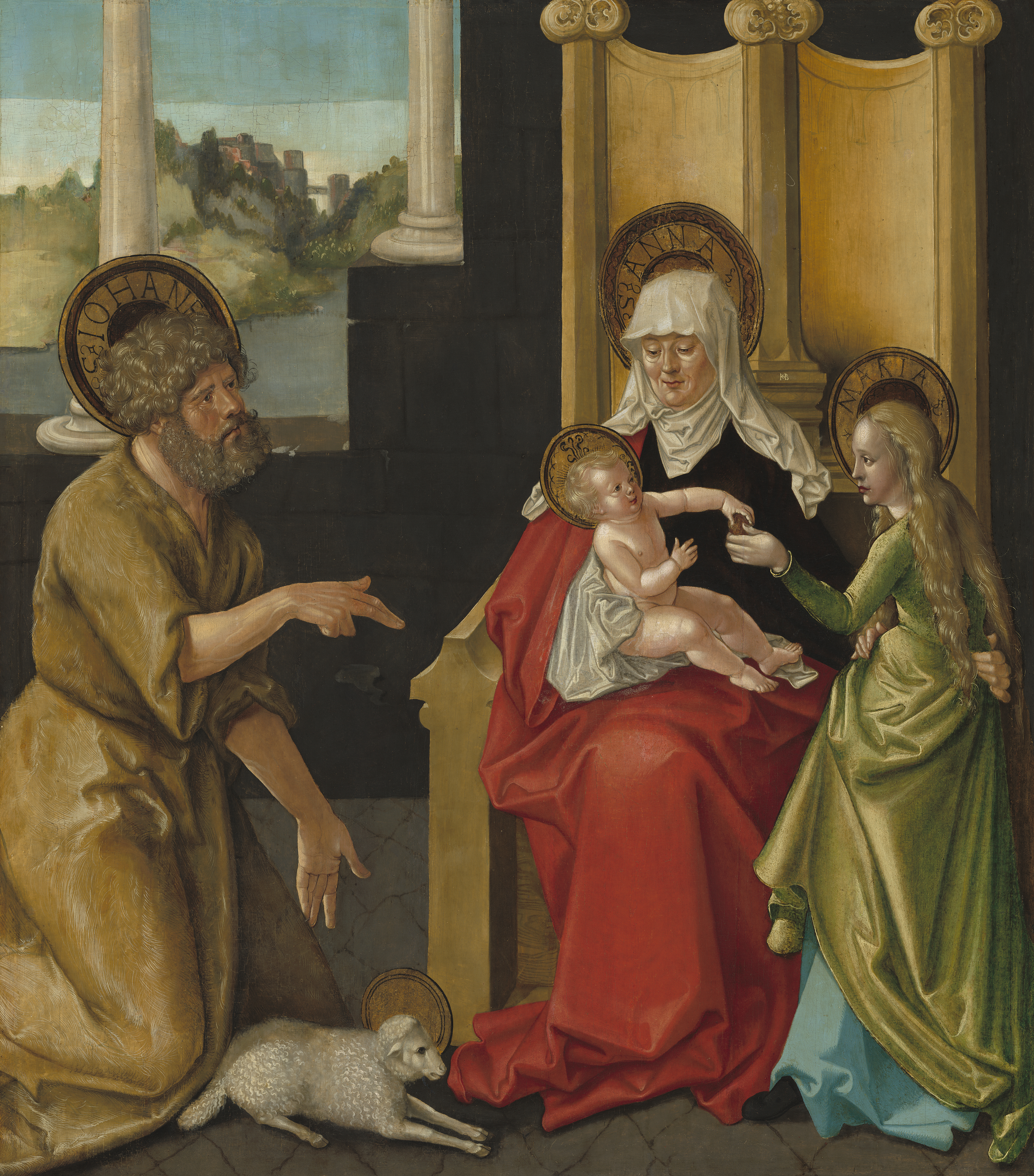
St Anne with the Christ Child, the Virgin, and St John the Baptist, Hans Baldung, c. 1511

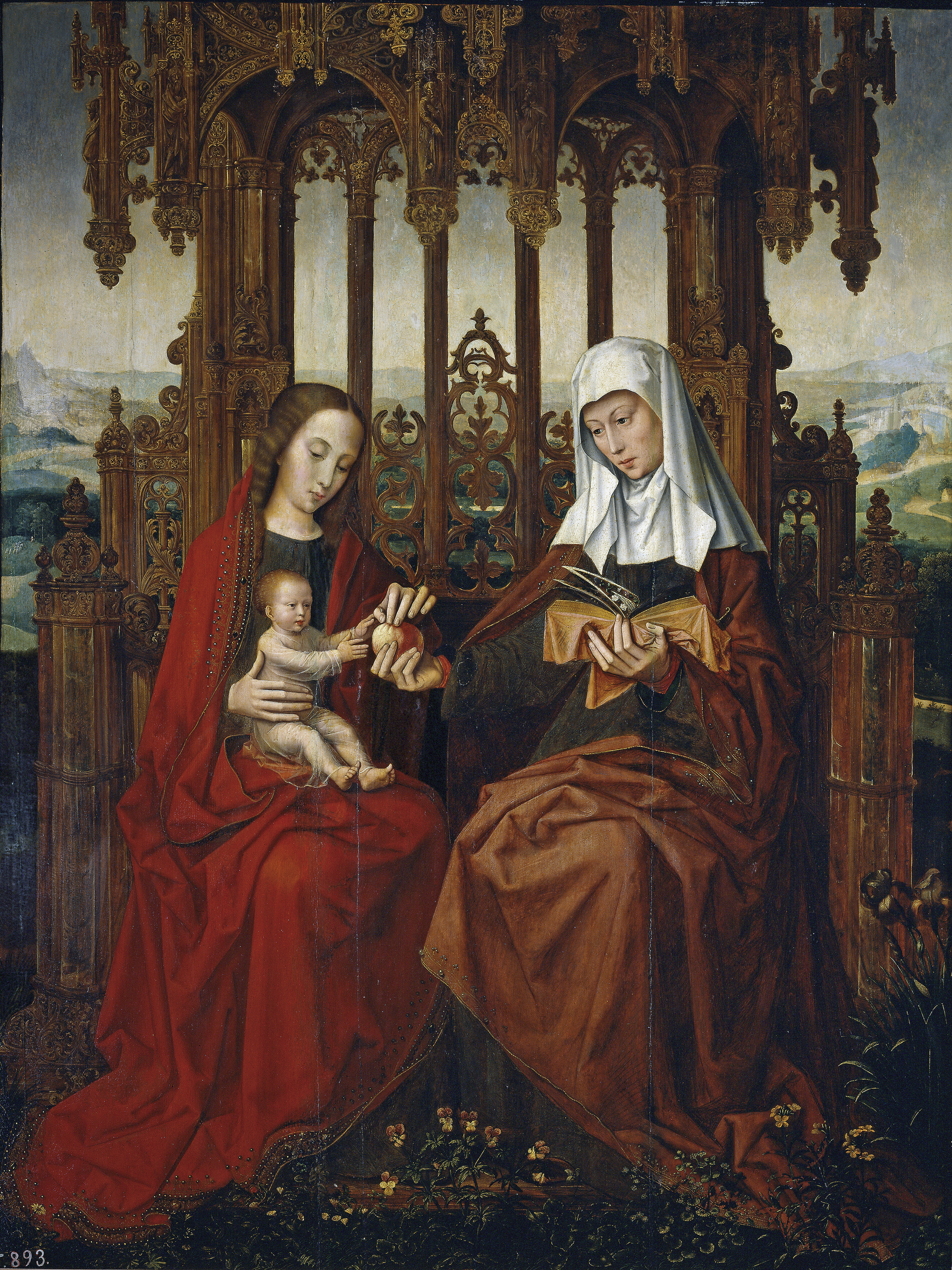
Ambrosius Benson, c. 1525–1550, from the Convent of Santa Cruz la Real, Segovia, Prado, Madrid

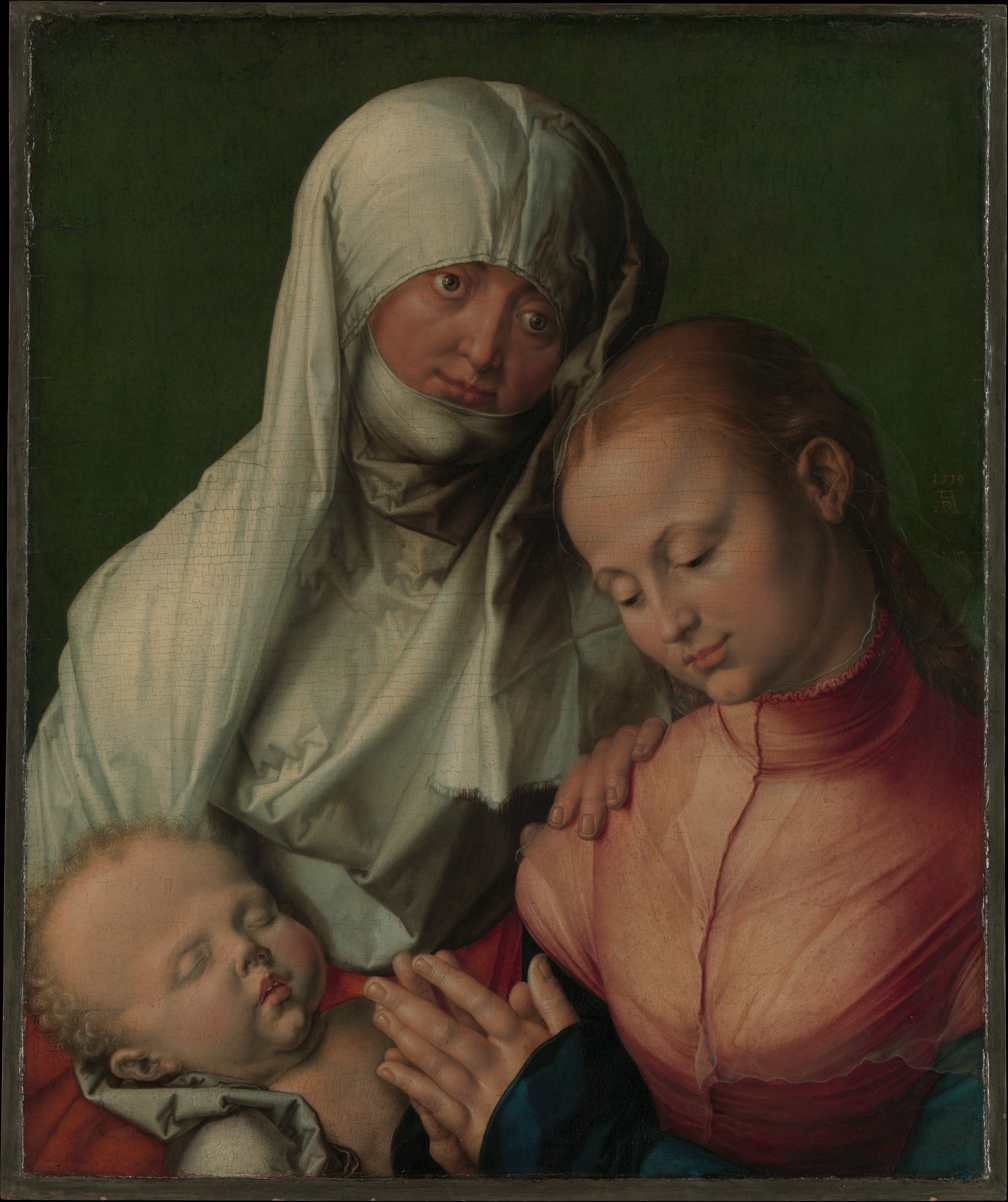
Albrecht Dürer, Virgin and Child with Saint Anne, probably 1519, MET, New York

Leonardo da Vinci's unfinished interpretation, c. 1503–1519, Louvre, Paris

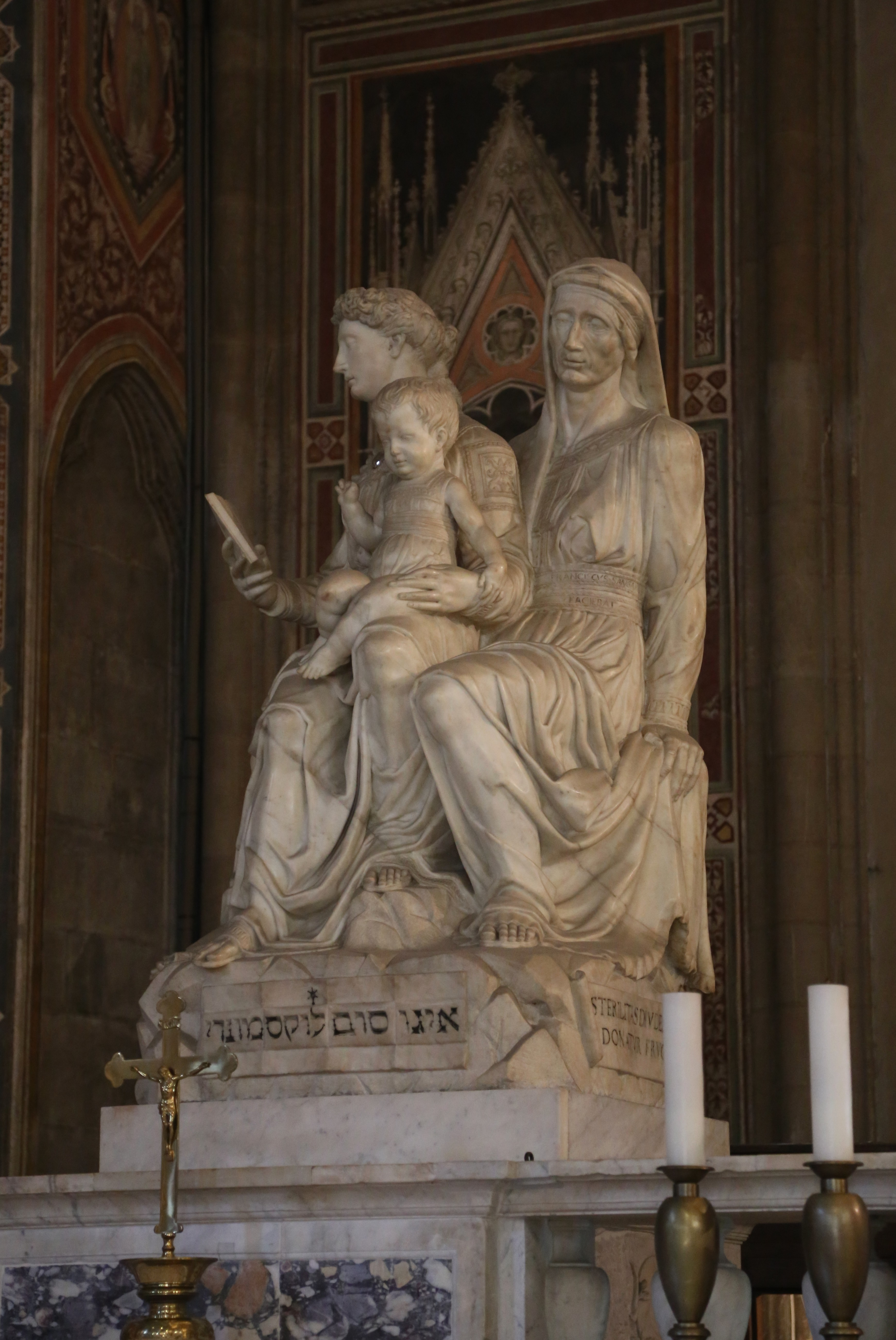
St. Anne altar with the Metterza by Francesco da Sangallo, c. 1526, Orsanmichele, Florence

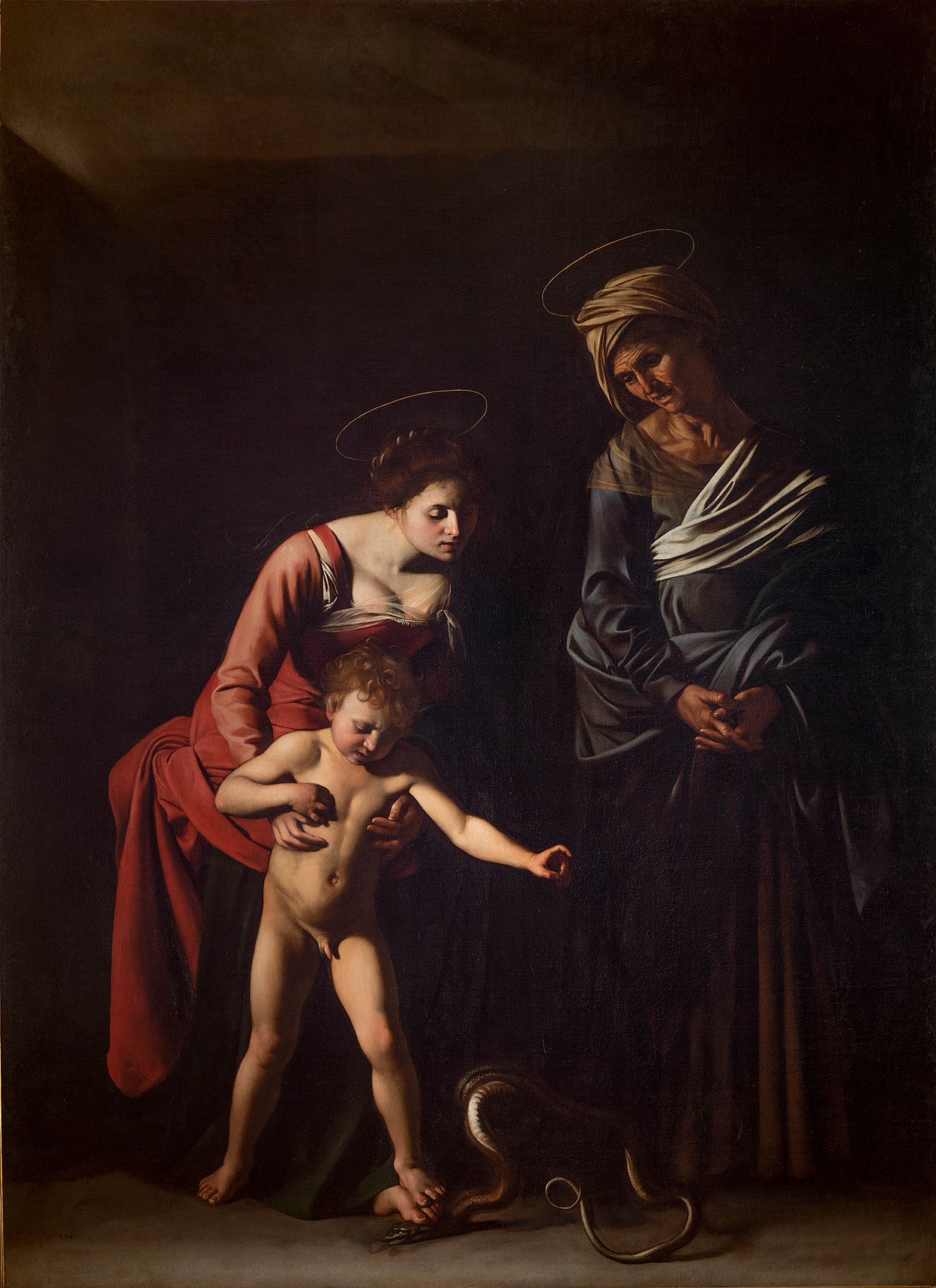
Caravaggio, La Madonna dei Palafrenieri, 1605

St Anne, Virgin and Child, wooden sculpture in Vadstena Abbey Church, Sweden, dated circa 1415

== See also ==
- Coat of arms of Annaberg-Buchholz in the Saxony's Erzgebirge mountain range
- The Virgin and Child with St. Anne (Leonardo), c. 1503
- Virgin and Child with St. Anne (Masaccio), c. 1424
- Studies of an Infant
