= Agia =

Agia, ayia, aghia, hagia, haghia or AGIA may refer to:

- Agia, feminine form of Agios, 'saint'

== Geography ==
=== Cyprus ===
- Agia, Cyprus
- Ayia Napa

=== Greece ===
- Agia, Chania, a town in Chania (regional unit), Crete, Greece
- Agia, Larissa, Greece
- Agia (Meteora), a rock in Thessaly, Greece
- Agia, Preveza, a town in the municipality of Parga, Preveza regional unit, Greece
- Lake Agia, on the island of Crete

== Other uses ==
- Saint Agia (died c. 711), Belgian Catholic saint also known as Aye
- Alaska Gasline Inducement Act, Alaskan State law
- Agia (moth), a synonym of the moth genus Acasis
