= Agide =

Agide (Italian pronunciation: [ˈaːdʒide]) is an Italian male given name, related to the ancient Greek name Agis.

== Notable people ==
Notable people with this name include:

- Agide Jacchia, Italian orchestral director
- Agide Simonazzi, Italian sprinter

== Other ==
- Agide (Alfieri), play by Vittorio Alfieri

== See also ==
- Agis (disambiguation)
