= Agios =

Greek word for 'sacred' or 'saint'

Agios (Greek: Άγιος), plural Agioi (Άγιοι), transcribes masculine gender Greek words meaning 'sacred' or 'saint' (for example Agios Dimitrios, Agioi Anargyroi). It is frequently shortened in colloquial language to Ai (for example Ai Stratis). In polytonic script it is written Hagios (Ἅγιος) (for example Hagios Demetrios). It is also transliterated as, among other things, Haghios, Ayios, Aghios (for example Ayios Dhometios, Aghios Andreas Beach, respectively) in the singular form, and Haghioi, Ayioi, Aghioi, Ayii in the plural (for example Ayioi Omoloyites, Nicosia, Aghioi Theodoroi, Ayii Trimithias respectively).

The feminine is agia, ayia, aghia, hagia or haghia (Greek: Αγία or in polytonic form Ἁγία), for example Agia Varvara (Saint Barbara).

== See also ==
- The dictionary definition of άγιος at Wiktionary
- Agia (disambiguation), the feminine form of the word in Greek
- Agis (disambiguation)
- Agii (disambiguation)
- Agius, a surname
- Agos, an Armenian newspaper
- Agoi, a clan and language spoken by that clan in Nigeria
- AGIO, the Australian Geospatial-Intelligence Organisation
