= Agis =

Agis or AGIS may refer to:

== People ==
- Agis I (died 900 BC), Spartan king
- Agis II (died 401 BC), Spartan king
- Agis III (died 331 BC), Spartan king
- Agis IV (265–241 BC), Spartan king
- Agis (Paeonian) (died 358 BC), King of the Paeonians
- Agis of Argos, ancient Greek poet
- Maurice Agis (1931–2009), British sculptor and artist

== Other uses ==
- Agis (play), by John Home
- Agis, several fictional emperors of Isaac Asimov's Galactic Empire
- Apex Global Internet Services
- Atomic gravitational wave interferometric sensor
- Advanced Glaucoma Intervention Study, conducted by the National Eye Institute

== See also ==
- Agide (disambiguation), modern Italian given name related to Agis
