= Dionisius A. Agius =

Professor of Arabic studies

Dionisius A. Agius (born 1945) is an Emeritus Professor of Arabic Studies and Islamic Material Culture at the University of Exeter. He is a Fellow of the British Academy and the Royal Society of Arts and the Royal Geographical Society.

== Biography ==
He received his PhD in 1984 from the University of Toronto. Between 1990 and 2000, he conducted extensive maritime ethnographic fieldwork on the coasts of the Persian Gulf and Oman, and from 2002 to 2014, on the African and Arabian coasts of the Red Sea.
