= Ross Agius =

Australian rules footballer

Personal information
- Full name: Ross M. Agius
- Born: 9 February 1962 (age 64); Rosewater, South Australia
- Original team: Rosewater (SAAFL)

Playing career
Years	Club	Games (Goals)
1979-1984	Port Adelaide	53 (103)

Career highlights
- Port Adelaide premiership player (1980)

Ross M. Agius (b. 9 February 1962) is a former Australian rules footballer who played for the Port Adelaide Football Club in the South Australian National Football League (SANFL) between 1979 and 1984.

Born in Rosewater, an outer western suburb of Adelaide, Agius played for Rosewater in the South Australian Amateur Football League (SAAFL) before debuting for Port Adelaide in 1979.

Agius made 53 appearances for Port, including the winning grand final of 1980 against Norwood, where he assisted in three goals.
