= Vincent Delieuvin =

French author and art historian

Vincent Delieuvin (born 1978) is a French author and art historian specializing in the work of Leonardo da Vinci, and in Italian paintings of the sixteenth century, generally. Since 2006, he has worked as a heritage curator at the Louvre museum.

== Biography ==
Vincent Delieuvin is an art historian and chief curator of Italian painting of the sixteenth century paintings department of the Louvre since 2006. He has written several books on Leonardo da Vinci. He is a knight of Arts and Letters. A graduate of the Institut national du patrimoine (Museums - State - Jacques Tati Promotion - 2003), he has curated several exhibitions. He has been a member of the editorial board of the Revue de l'Art since 2015.

Winner of the Carnot Foundation grant in 2004, he spent five months in Rome to study the artistic fortune of Federico Barocci. A recipient of the Focillon grant in 2015, he spent several months in the United States thanks to Yale University for his project: "Original, copy, derivation. The work of Leonardo da Vinci through the covers of his followers. Study of Leonardo's works in public collections in the United States".

Delieuvin has commented on the authenticity of one of the paintings under his supervision, the Mona Lisa. In 2005, a scholar at Heidelberg University discovered a marginal note in a 1477 printing of a volume by ancient Roman philosopher Cicero. The note was dated October 1503, and was written by Leonardo's contemporary Agostino Vespucci. This note likens Leonardo to renowned Greek painter Apelles, who is mentioned in the text, and states that Leonardo was at that time working on a painting of Lisa del Giocondo. In response, Delieuvin stated "Leonardo da Vinci was painting, in 1503, the portrait of a Florentine lady by the name of Lisa del Giocondo. About this we are now certain. Unfortunately, we cannot be absolutely certain that this portrait of Lisa del Giocondo is the painting of the Louvre". Circa 1505, Raphael executed a pen-and-ink sketch of the Mona Lisa, with columns flanking the subject. It was thought that the Mona Lisa had been trimmed, but by 1993, Frank Zöllner observed that the painting surface had never been trimmed, which was confirmed through a series of tests in 2004. In view of this, Delieuvin stated in 2017 that the sketch and other copies must have been inspired by another version.

He wrote a book about the Salvator Mundi at the end of 2019 which was reportedly only distributed for 2 hours before being withdrawn from sale due to the exhibition context and political tension with Saudi Arabia's Crown Prince Mohamed bin Salmane, who is said to own it.

== Publications ==
- Leonardo da Vinci, Vincent Delieuvin and Louis Frank (ed.) Co-edition Louvre museum editions / Hazan, October 2019. Exhibition catalog, 480 p., 29.5 x 3.7 x 24.8 cm. (ISBN 2754111239 ), (ISBN 978-2754111232 )
- Leonardo da Vinci in 15 questions. Hazan, 2019. 84 pages, 23 cm. (ISBN 978-2754110655 )
- Léonard de Vinci, Delpire éd., Collection: "Poche illustrateur", 2019. 128 pages, 19 x 1.1 x 12.5 cm (ISBN 979-1095821205 )
- La Joconde nue, Co-edition Domaine de Chantilly - Musée Condé and In Fine art editions, 2019. exhibition catalog, 224 pages, 228 * 287 * 20, (ISBN 978-2951985162 )
- What's wrong with this Mona Lisa?, Actes Sud junior, 2016. 61 pages, 21 cm. (ISBN 978-2-330-06892-9 )
- La Sainte Anne, the ultimate masterpiece by Leonardo da Vinci, Vincent Delieuvin (dir.) With Françoise Barbe, Cécile Beuzelin, Sue Ann Chui. Officina Libraria, collection: "Musée du Louvre", 2012. exhibition catalog, 448 pages, 24.5 x 3.4 x 29.3 cm. (ISBN 978-8-88985-487-7 )
- Raphaël, the last years, Editions du Louvre and Hazan, 2012. Exhibition catalog, 400 pages. (ISBN 9782754106689 )
- Baccio Bandinelli: drawings, sculptures, paintings, Françoise Viatte and Marc Bormand for the sculptures, Vincent Delieuvin for the painting; with the collaboration of Véronique Goarin. Louvre éditions, Officina libraria, 2011. 318 pages, 28 cm. (ISBN 978-2-35031-315-3 )
- Titian, Tintoretto, Véronèse, rivalries in Venice, Vincent Delieuvin and Jean Habert; assisted by Arturo Galansino. Hazan: Musée du Louvre éditions, 2009. Exhibition catalog, 479 pages, 29.5 x 4 x 25.5 cm. (ISBN 978-2-7541-0405-0) and (ISBN 978-2-35031-252-1 ). And, from the same authors with Amine Kharchach: the exhibition album: 47 pages, 29 cm, (ISBN 978-2-7541-0405-0) and (ISBN 978-2-35031-253-8 )

== Exhibitions ==
As curator:

- Louis XVI and Marie-Antoinette in Compiègne, Museums and national estates of the Imperial Palace of Compiègne, France, 25 October 2006 - January 29, 2007
- Titian, Tintoretto, Veronese… Rivalry in Venice, Museum of Fine Arts in Boston, USA, from March 15, 2009 at Aug 16, 2009 then Louvre Museum, France, from September 17, 2009 at January 4, 2010
- La Sainte Anne, Leonardo da Vinci's ultimate masterpiece, Louvre Museum, France, March 29, 2012 at June 25, 2012
- Raphaël, the last years, Louvre Museum, France, October 11, 2012 - Jan. 14, 2013
- The naked Mona Lisa, Domain of Chantilly, France, 1 st June -October 6, 2019
- Leonardo da Vinci, Louvre Museum, France, October 24, 2019 - February 24, 2020
