= Apex Global Internet Services =

- Type: Private
- Industry: Telecommunications
- Founded: 1994
- Founder: Phillip J Lawlor
- Headquarters: Dearborn, Michigan, United States
- Area served: Worldwide
- Products: Internet access, Colocation

AGIS (Apex Global Internet Services) is a former Internet backbone based in Dearborn, Michigan, United States. It is most remembered as having openly hosted spam email services, which destroyed its reputation and led to its bankruptcy.

== Corporate history ==
AGIS was founded as Apex Global Information Services in 1994 by Phillip J Lawlor. AGIS acquired Network99, Inc. in July 1995.

Lawlor believed an ISP was not responsible for policing the content of its customers traffic. This hands-off policy resulted in a safe haven for the notorious spammer Sanford Wallace. By 1997, when Wallace's account was finally terminated, the ISP's reputation had been ruined. The company filed for Chapter 11 bankruptcy protection in February, 2000.

AGIS was acquired by Telia Internet, Inc. in 2000. Telia Internet, Inc. was acquired by Aleron Broadband, Inc. in 2001. Aleron Broadband was acquired by Cogent Communications in 2004.

== Products ==
In 1997, AGIS introduced its colocation product under the brand name "CoolLocation."
