= Study for the Head of Saint Anne =

Drawing by Leonardo da Vinci

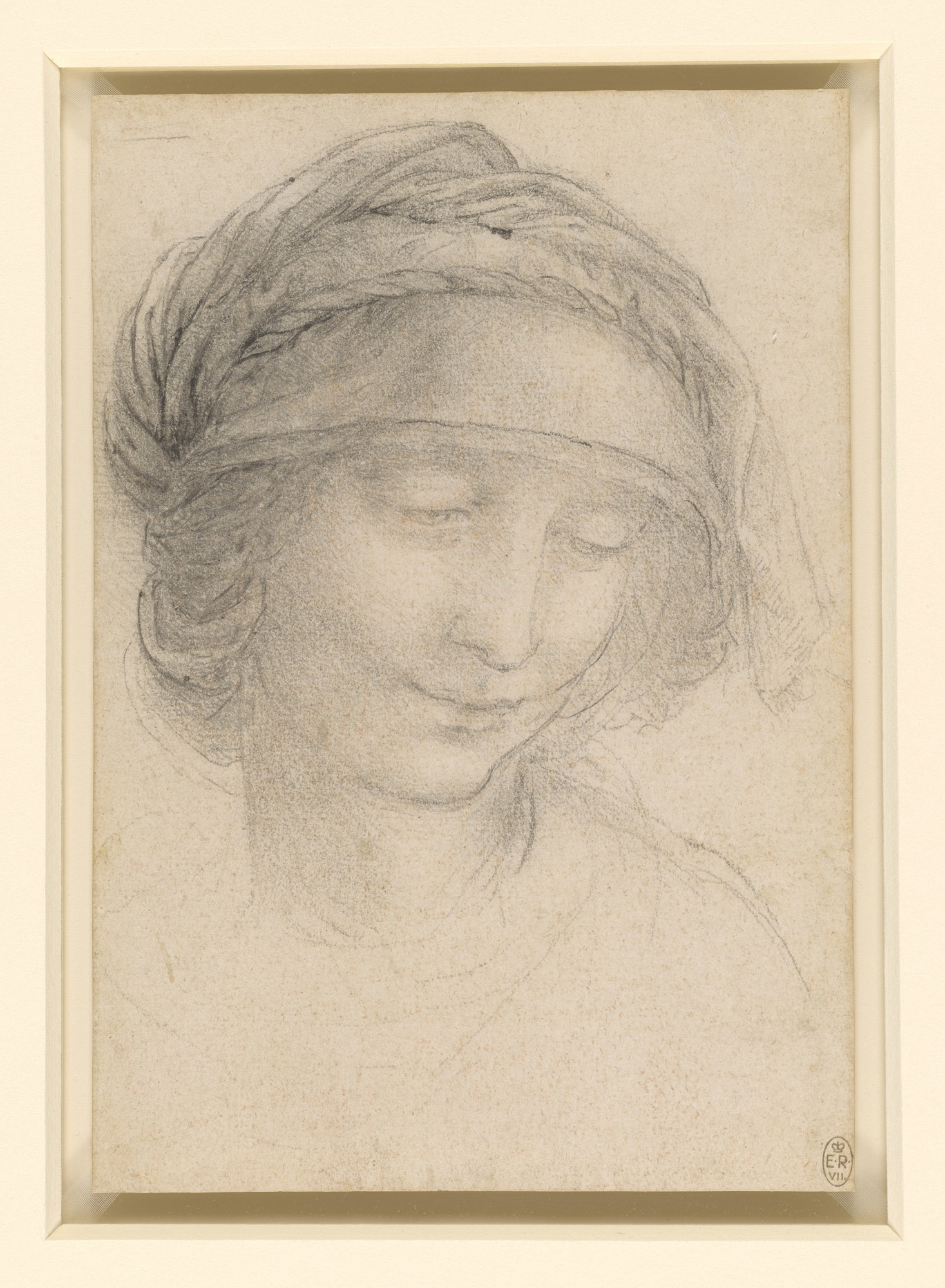
- Artist: Leonardo da Vinci
- Year: Around 1502–1503
- Subject: The Virgin and Child with Saint Anne (Leonardo)
- Location: Windsor Castle, Windsor
- Accession: RCIN 912533

The Study for the Head of Saint Anne is a drawing on paper executed in black stone by Leonardo da Vinci and preserved at Windsor Castle. It is a portrait of a woman, and is considered to be the preparatory study for the head of Saint Anne in the painting Sainte Anne, la Vierge et l'Enfant Jésus jouant avec un agneau (Saint Anne, the Virgin and the Child Jesus Playing with a Lamb) in the Louvre Museum.

Probably made around 1502–1503 -although some scholars put the date back to 1508-1515- the drawing belongs to a series of studies that enabled the painter to create the cartoon he used to elaborate the painting from the same period. Nevertheless, the artist made a number of modifications, as evidenced by a copy of the cartoon – the Resta-Esterhazy cartoon, which has now disappeared, but of which photographs have survived – and by scientific imaging analyses: he thus modified the face, then the hairstyle during the creation of the cartoon, and did so directly on the panel as a repentance.

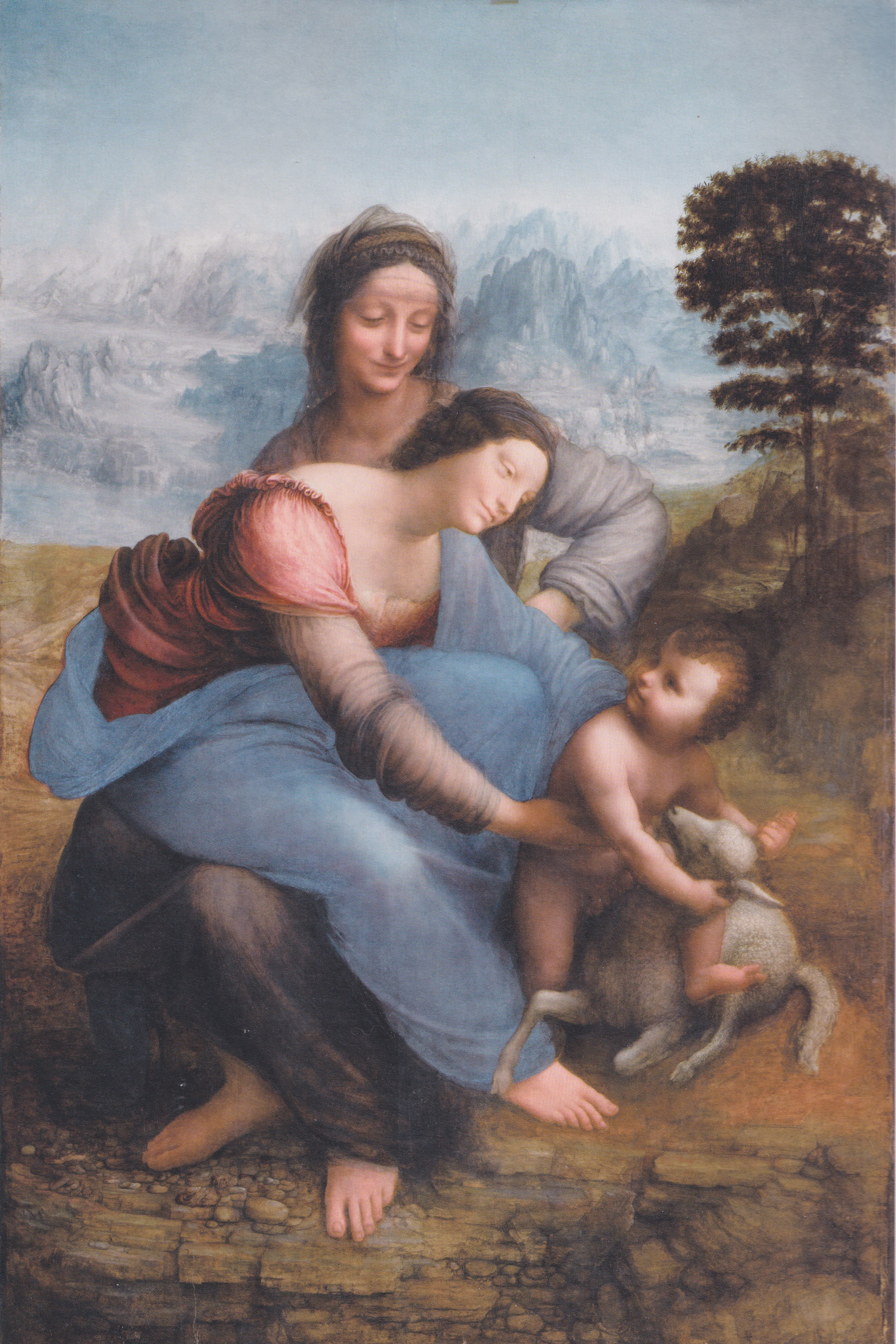
The painting was created as part of The Virgin and Child with Saint Anne (1503 – 1519, Musée du Louvre, n°^{.} inv. 776).

The Florence master's mastery of the translation of volume and light is evident. And although working within the iconographic theme of the "Trinitarian St. Anne" with its rather strict conventions, he deploys elements of his own ideals in the faces he usually depicts.

== Description ==
The drawing for the Study for the Head of St. Anne is based on a rectangular sheet of paper measuring 18.8 × 13.0 cm. It is executed in black stone.

It shows a portrait of a young woman, with her head and part of her left shoulder visible. The drawing descends to the top of the chest, where what appear to be two flaps of the veil the woman wears over her head appear to meet. Slightly tilted downwards, her face is seen in a three-quarter view, leaning a sinistra (on her left side). The top of the head is covered by a long, opaque veil that conceals the entire head of hair, the ends of which meet at the back of the head and are brought together at the top. A piece of cloth hangs slightly over the figure's left temple.

== History ==
=== Creation context ===
At the time of the creation of the Study for the Head of St. Anne in 1502–1503, Leonardo da Vinci was approaching fifty years of age. By this time, he was sufficiently famous that important clients from Italy and other European countries were vying for his services as engineer and artist: Isabella d'Este, Caesar Borgia and the French king Louis XII.

Since 1499, he has been working on the creation of a "Trinitarian St. Anne", although the exact commissioner has not been established. Declaring himself to be away from painting and more of an engineer, Leonardo da Vinci produced few works during this period, apart from the fresco of The Last Supper (which he completed in 1498) and a Madonna of the Yarnwinder (dating from 1501). After successively discarding two earlier cartoons -the Burlington House cartoon (between 1499 and early 1501) and the so-called "Fra Pietro" cartoon (between 1500 and April 1501) -he produced a final one in 1502–1503, which he used to create Sainte Anne, la Vierge et l'Enfant Jésus jouant avec un agneau. According to most scholars, the drawing of Saint Anne's head is a preparatory study for this third carton.

=== Attribution and dating ===
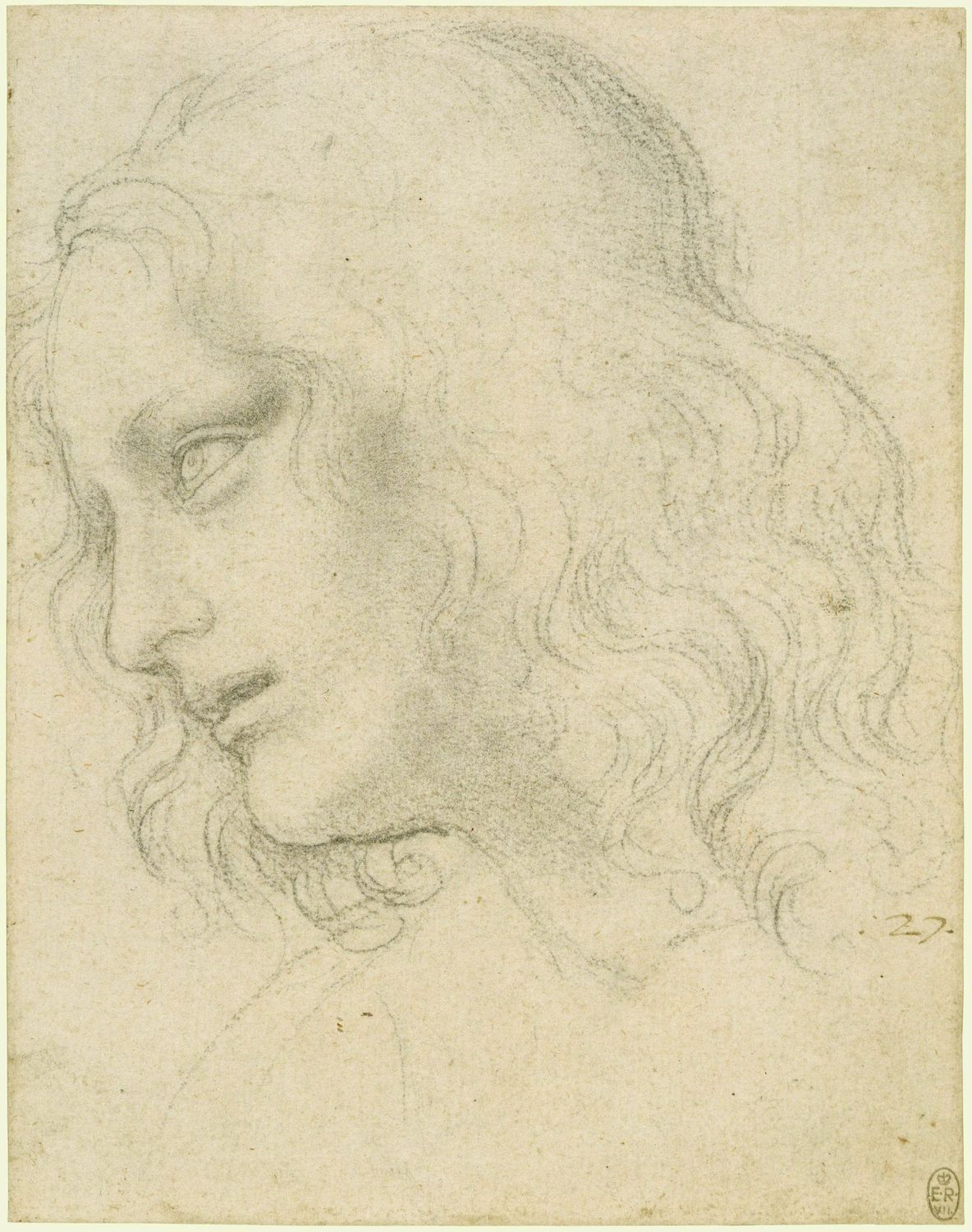
Leonardo da Vinci, Study for the head of Philip the Apostle for The Last Supper, circa 1495, Windsor Castle, inv.^{no.} RCIN 912551.

The attribution to Leonardo da Vinci is unanimous in the scientific community, notably Frank Zöllner and Johannes Nathan, Carmen C. Bambach, Vincent Delieuvin and Kenneth Clark, and is also asserted by the work's owner, Windsor Castle.

On the other hand, the dating of his work fluctuates widely among researchers. For example, Vincent Delieuvin estimates it to be "circa 1502-1503", i.e. at the very beginning of the painting's creation, and thus a study for the initial carton: his technique, found in drawings from this period marked by the exclusive use of black stone, such as the Study for the Head of Philip the Apostle for The Last Supper (c. 1495) or the Study for the Head of Two Soldiers in The Battle of Anghiari (1504–1505), provides a decisive indication. In addition, a note by Agostino Vespucci written in 1503 in the margin of Cicero's Epistulae ad familiares suggests that, on the one hand, the painting was started at this date and, on the other, that the painter began his work precisely with the face of Saint Anne. For his part, Kenneth Clark gives a date of "1508–1510"14 when the work's owner puts it back "between 1510 and 1515", believing that the painting only began in 1508 and justifying this imprecision by the lack of knowledge in the development of the technique used by the painter during his last years in Milan and Rome. In fact, some researchers, such as Frank Zöllner and Johannes Nathan, propose a very broad and question-ridden dating: "circa 1501–1510 (?)".

=== Path of the artwork ===
The Study for the Head of Saint Anne was part of the Melzi-Leoni collection: a collection of drawings and manuscripts by Leonardo da Vinci inherited by Francesco Melzi on his death in 1519; after a period of dispersal, this collection -including the drawing- was largely assembled between 1582 and 1590 by Pompeo Leoni. Subsequently, in the 1630s, the drawing passed to the London collections of Thomas Howard, 14th Earl of Arundel, who had managed to acquire the second great compendium compiled by Pompeo Leoni and known today as the "Codex Windsor". Probably acquired by the British monarch Charles II, it became part of the Royal Collection at least as early as 1690, and has been kept at Windsor Castle ever since.

== A study for Saint Anne, the Virgin and Child Jesus playing with a lamb ==
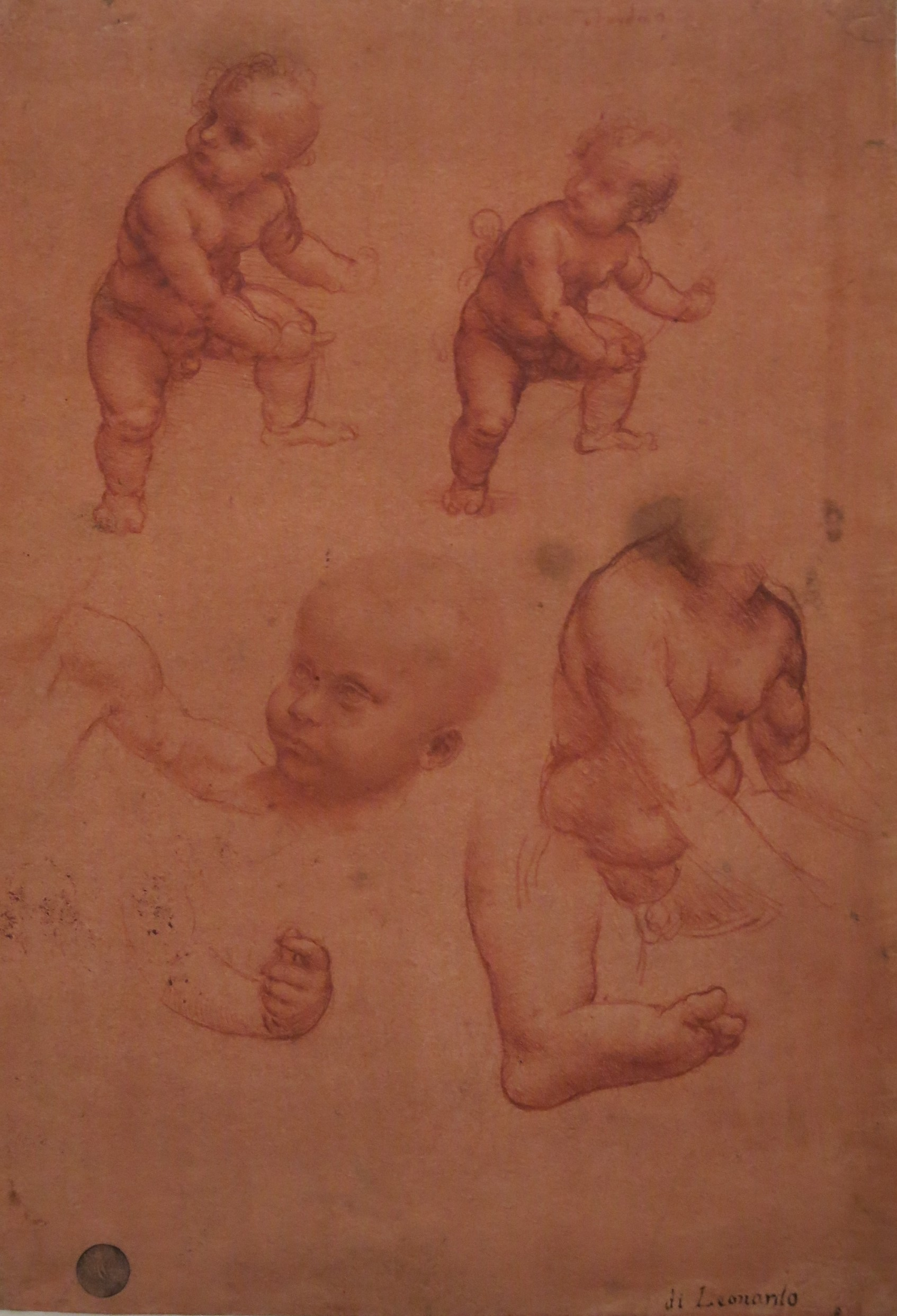
Another contemporary of the Study for the Head of Saint Anne: Études pour l'Enfant Jésus, c. 1502–1503, Venice, Accademia Galleries, n° inv. 257.

The Étude pour la tête de sainte Anne drawing is unanimously recognised as a preparatory study for the head of Saint Anne in the painting Saint Anne, the Virgin and Child Jesus playing with a lamb in the Louvre.

Two types of studies are directly related to the painting Saint Anne, the Virgin and Child Jesus playing with a lamb: those that enabled the creation of the carton and those that constitute "the final changes decided by the master" and are therefore the furthest removed from it in time. With its exclusive use of black stone, so characteristic of Leonardo da Vinci's style at the beginning of the century, the drawing belongs firmly in the first group.

The woman's smile, the veil she wears and the tilt of her face are all reminiscent of the painting. Nevertheless, the drawing stands out from this group in certain details: the face is thinner, and does not correspond perfectly to the painted version, in which the eyes, nose and mouth, in particular, have been rounded. The hairstyle is also quite different from what can be seen in real life; in fact, it corresponds much more closely to what could be seen on the Resta-Esterhazy cartoon, a reputedly contemporary and faithful copy of the original cartoon. Last but not least, the head appears more inclined than that depicted on the painting, as do the shoulders, which are turned more towards the viewer than on the painting.

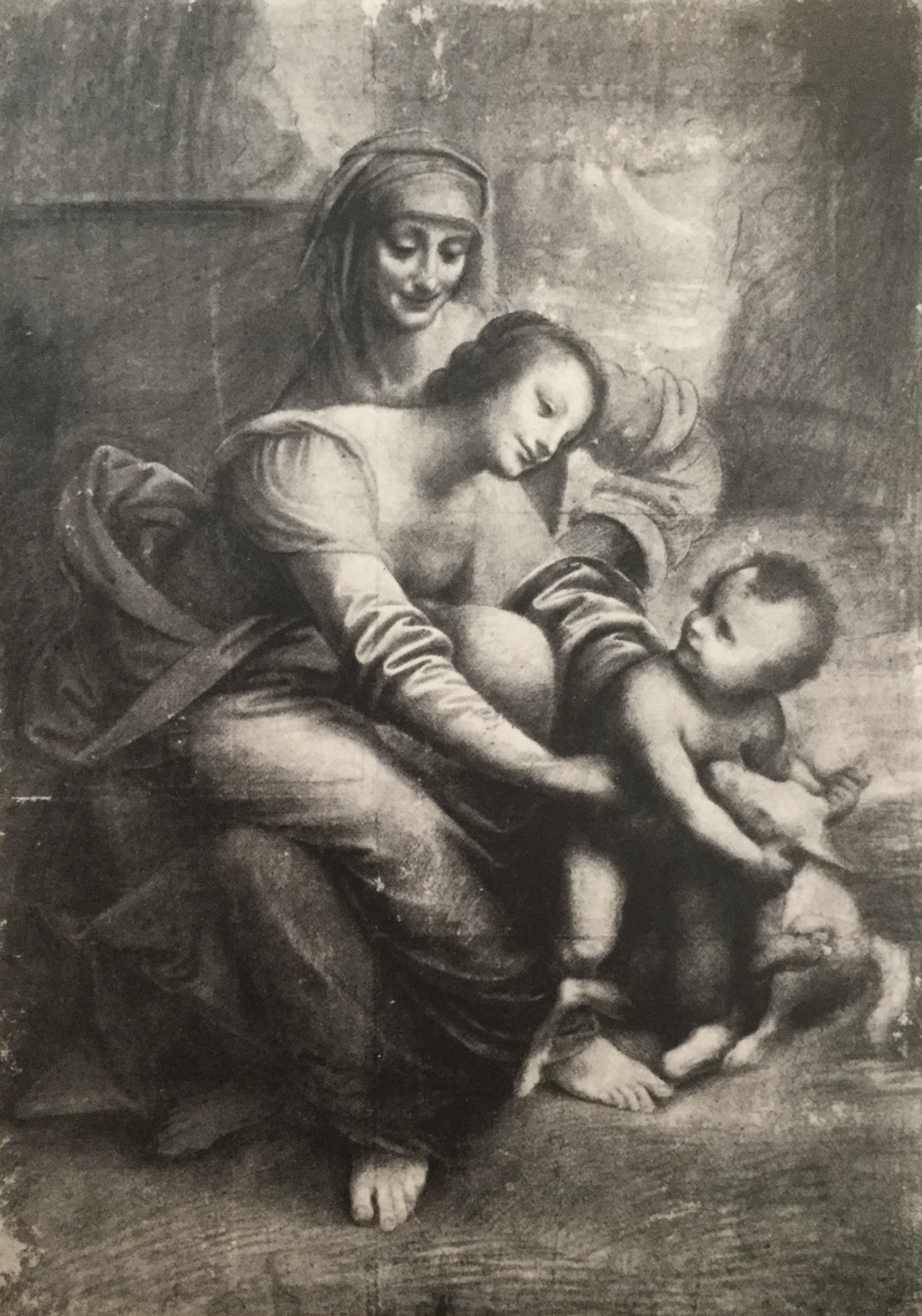
Atelier de Léonard de Vinci (?), Carton Resta-Esterhazy, circa 1503–1506, formerly in Budapest, lost during the Second World War.

It is therefore possible to describe how the study fits into the process of creating the painting: after drawing up an overall sketch of his composition, the painter begins detail studies, including that of the head of Saint Anne; then he creates a carton – the third – that incorporates all his research. At the same time, or shortly afterwards, a member of his studio created a faithful copy of this cartoon: the Resta-Esterhazy cartoon, whose interest lies in the fact that it testifies to the transition between the study and the final realisation. It shows that, while the face was somewhat modified between the study and the carton (features were rounded off, enlarged and regularised), the hairstyle remained unchanged. Similarly, when transferred from cartoon to panel, the hairstyle remained identical in the first version, as shown by the study of the underlay of the painting. It was only during the design phase that the painter reworked it. Scientists thus have at their disposal the analysis of the pentimento by scientific imagery cross-referenced with observations made on photos of the Resta-Esterhazy carton.

Comparison of the study, its cartoon implementation and its realisation in the board.

Study for the head of Saint Anne (circa 1502–1503).

The head of Saint Anne in the Resta-Esterhazy carton (detail, circa 1503–1506, no longer extant).

La tête de sainte Anne au sein de Sainte Anne, la Vierge et l'Enfant Jésus jouant avec un agneau (detail, 1503–1519, Paris, Louvre Museum, inv. no. INV 776).

Comparison of the study, its cartoon implementation and its realisation within the board.

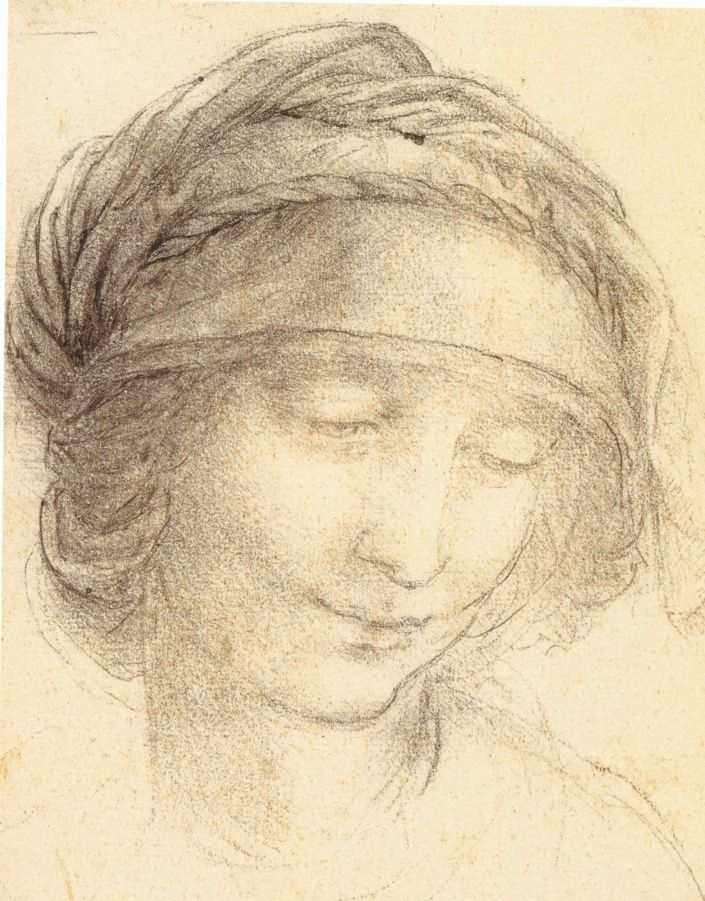
Study for the head of Saint Anne (c. 1502-1503).

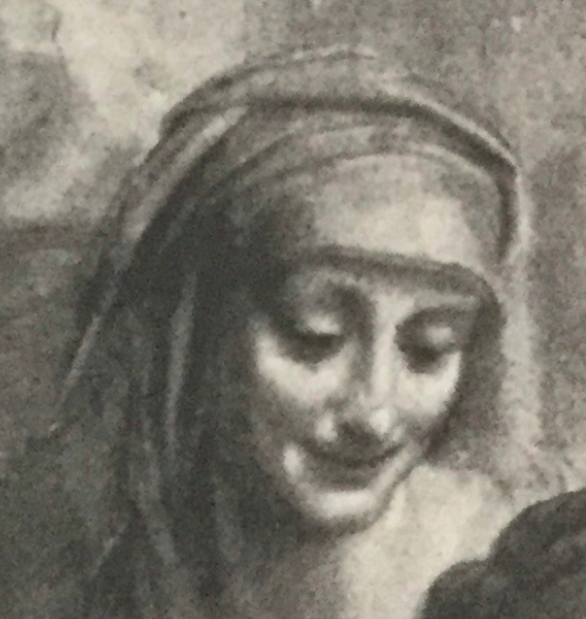
The head of Saint Anne in the Resta-Esterhazy carton (detail, c. 1503-1506, no longer extant).

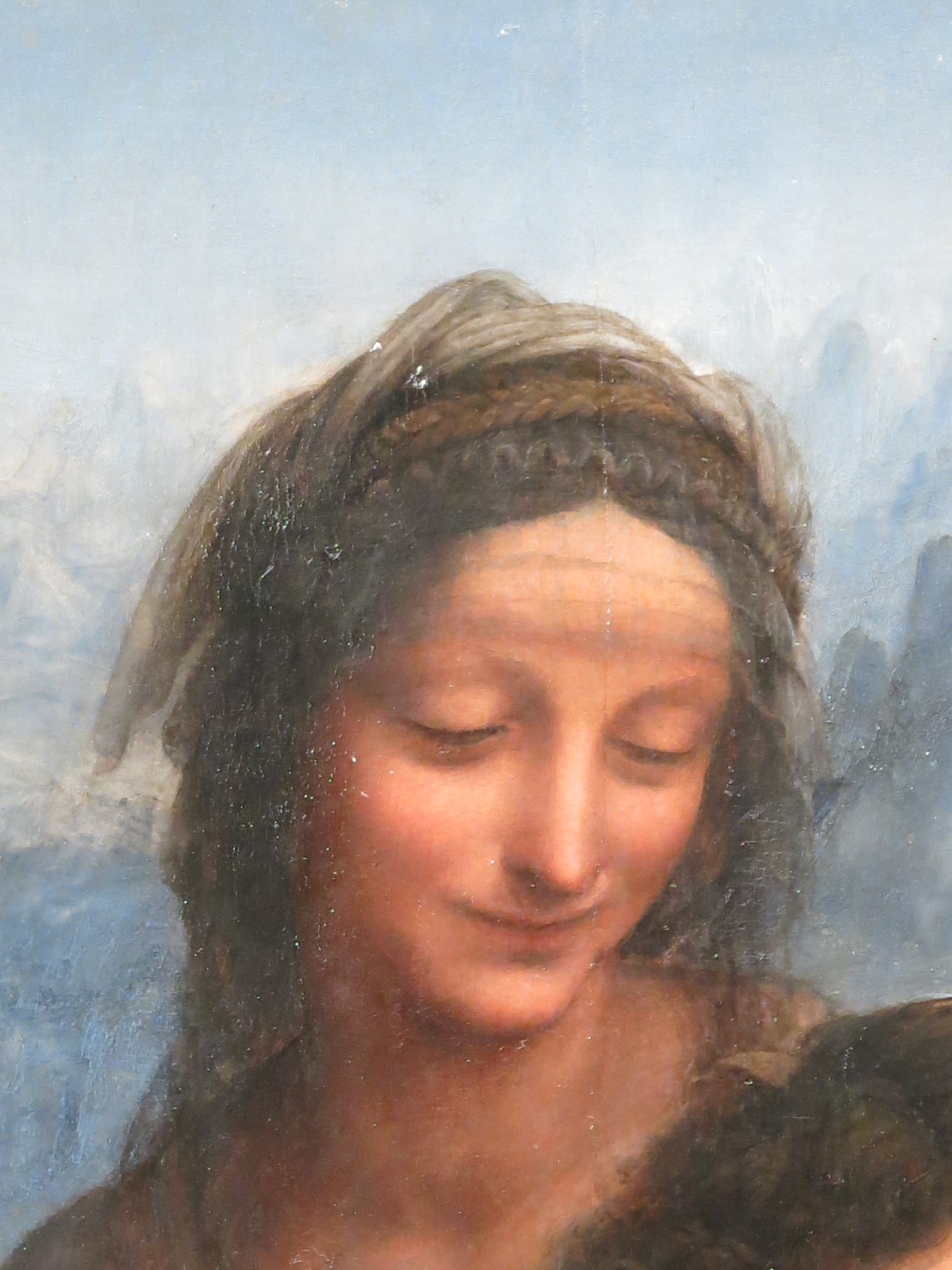
The head of Saint Anne within Saint Anne, the Virgin and Child Jesus playing with a lamb (detail, 1503-1519, Paris, Musée du Louvre, inv.^{no.} INV 776)

== Analysis ==
=== A portrait between imposed figure and ideal face ===
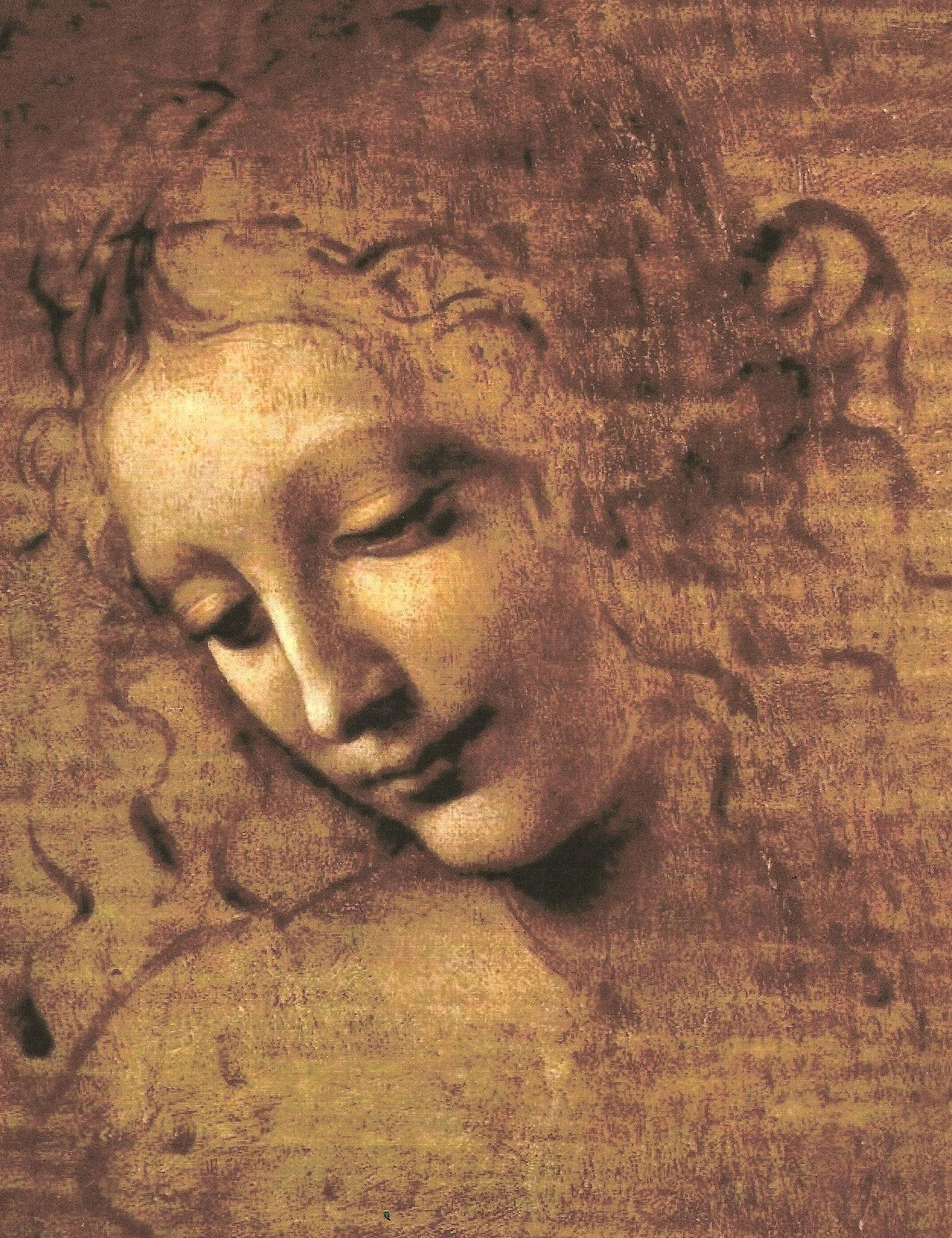
A woman's face seen in three-quarter view, with her gaze tilted downwards: a classic representation by Leonardo da Vinci(La Scapigliata, between 1506 and 1508, Parma, National Gallery,^{no.} inv.GN362).

Despite his penchant for breaking certain rules, Leonardo da Vinci's Study for the Head of Saint Anne is part of the iconographic theme of the "Trinitarian Saint Anne", whose conventions are strict and to which he adheres23. For example, the depiction of Anne requires her head to be covered, as she is a woman whose advanced age must be indicated. But this prevents the painter from giving free rein to his taste for complex, ornamental hairstyles. Failing to depict a complex head of hair, the painter is careful to depict a veil meticulously folded over the top of the head.

Nonetheless, the painter adheres to his own archetypes: as in most of his depictions of female faces, he depicts a bent-over face, with downwardly inclined gaze. The sheet's ambition is [...] to compose a head of ideal expression, even if it is less stylised than in the painting, as if Leonardo still retained the memory of a real face". The mouth appears more natural, wearing a more discreet smile3, which led Kenneth Clark to say that he found "more truth in this face than in the one depicted in the Louvre painting".

=== The art of the illusion of light and shadow ===
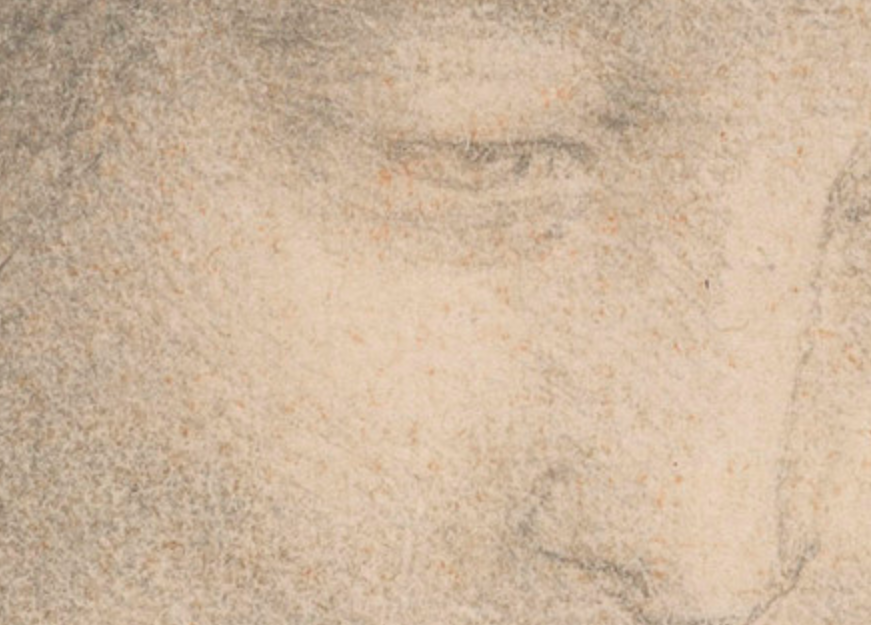
A close-up of the cheekbone reveals the blurring effects of the black chalk (detail).

In the Study for the Head of Saint Anne, the artist uses techniques that foreshadow the sfumato effects present in the painting. Sfumato is a pictorial technique characteristic of his work, theorised in his writings:

"See to it that your light and shadow merge without lines or strokes, like smoke."

The process consists in creating the illusion of relief through light transitions, by softening the lines containing the shapes. The painter also emphasises soft lighting from the right. To achieve this, he blurs with black stone. This technique represents a practical application of his scientific observations on light; the drawing marks a stage of maturation in his mastery, compared, for example, to that displayed in the Study for the Head of Philip the Apostle for The Last Supper, which predates the drawing by some seven years. It is precisely this ability to translate the results of observing physical effects on bodies that makes the Study for the Head of Saint Anne a work in which "a pictorial language of magical force and nuance "29 can be expressed.

== Posterity ==
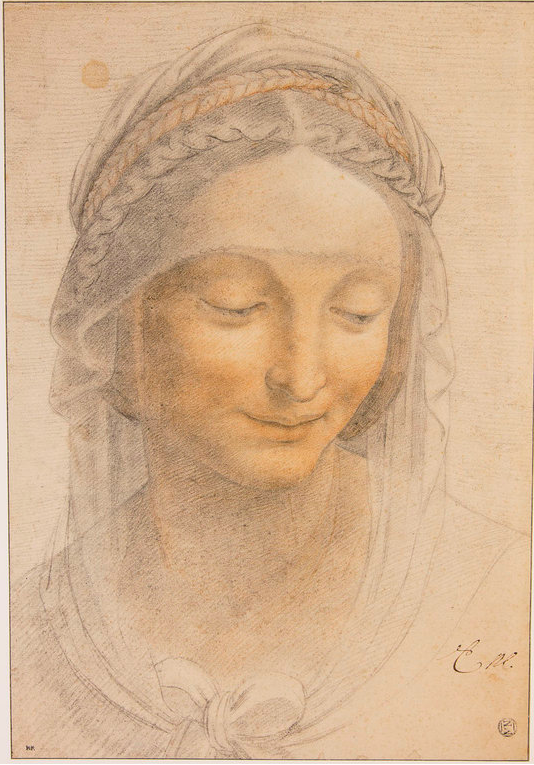
Copy after Leonardo da Vinci, Head of Saint Anne, c. 1510-1520, Musée du Louvre, Département des arts graphiques, inv. INV 2564, recto.

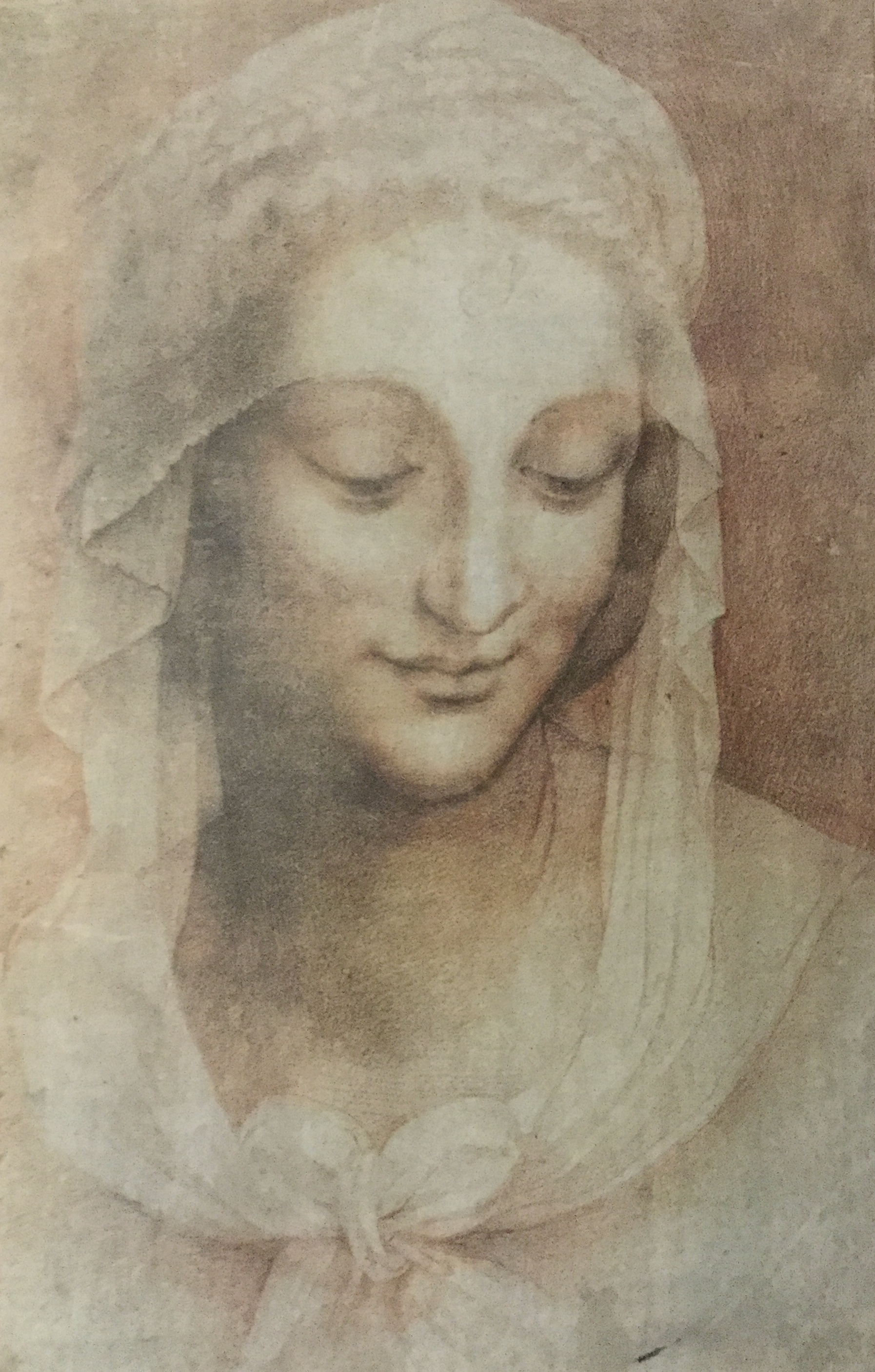
Copy after Leonardo da Vinci, Head of Saint Anne, c. 1510-1520, Vienna, Albertina Museum, inv. no. INV 53.

The drawing Study for the Head of Saint Anne was copied several times by Leonardo da Vinci's contemporary or immediate followers. One of the best-known is in the Graphic Arts Department of the Louvre, dated circa 1510–1520 and possibly by a pupil in the master's workshop. Its interest lies in the fact that it confirms that the changes to the headdress were certainly made during the execution of the painting3. The Albertina Museum in Vienna has a copy (no. inv. 53) dated circa 1510–1520, which incorporates elements of both the drawing (the veil over the forehead) and the final painting (the left-hand braid with the end hidden). In 2012, the Paris exhibition devoted to the painting at the Louvre succeeded in bringing together five copies of the Étude pour la tête de sainte Anne, and listed three more in the illustrations in its catalogue.

== See also ==
- Study (art)
- Leonardo da Vinci
- The Virgin and Child with Saint Anne (Leonardo)

== Bibliography ==
- Bambach, Carmen; Vecce, Carlo; Pedretti, Carlo; Viatte, Françoise; Cecchi, Alessandro; Kemp, Martin; Marani, Pietro C.; Farago, Claire; Forcione, Varena; et al. (Anne-Marie Logan et Linda Wolk-Simon) (2003). Leonardo da Vinci, master draftsman [« Léonard de Vinci, maître du dessin du corps humain. New York; New Haven: Metropolitan Museum of Art; Yale University Press. pp. 242–722. ISBN 978-1-5883-9034-9.
- Bramly, Serge (2019). "chap. 9 (« Lauriers et orages »)". Léonard de Vinci : Une biographie. Paris: Jean-Claude Lattès. ISBN 978-2-7096-6323-6.
- Delieuvin, Vincent; et al. (Françoise Barbe, Cécile Beuzelin, Sue Ann Chui, Pierre Curie, Myriam Eveno, Élisabeth Foucart-Walter, Louis Frank, Cecilia Frozinini, Ana Gonzalez Mozo, Sophie Guillot de Suduiraut, Claurio Gulli, Bruno Mottin, Cinzia Pasquali, Alan Phenix, Cristina Quattrini, Élisabeth Ravaud, Cécile Scailliérez, Naoko Takahatake) (2012). La Sainte Anne : l'ultime chef-d'œuvre de léonard de Vinci. Paris: Louvre éditions. ISBN 978-2-35031-370-2. OCLC 796188596.
- Delieuvin, Vincent; Frank, Louis (2019). "chap. 166 (« Étude pour la sainte Anne : le visage d'Anne". Léonard de Vinci : 1452–1519. Paris: Musée du Louvre. ISBN 978-2-85088-725-3.
- Delieuvin, Vincent; et al. (Louis Frank, Gilles Bastian, Jean-Louis Bellec, Roberto Bellucci, Thomas Calligaro, Myriam Eveno, Cecilia Frosinini, Éric Laval, Bruno Mottin, Laurent Pichon, Élisabeth Ravaud, Thomas Bohl, Benjamin Couilleaux, Barbara Jatta, Ludovic Laugier, Pietro C. Marani, Dominique Thiébaut, Stefania Tullio Cataldo et Inès Villela-Petit (pref. Brian Moynihan; Xavier Salmon; Sébastien Allard)) (2019). Léonard de Vinci. Paris-Vanves: Louvre éditions – Hazan. ISBN 978-2-7541-1123-2. OCLC 1129815512.
- Zöllner, Frank; Nathan, Johannes (2016). Léonard de Vinci, 1452-1519 : L'œuvre graphique. Translated by Fruhtrunk, Wolf. Cologne: Taschen. ISBN 978-3-8365-5440-4.
