= Study for the Virgin's Right Arm =

Drawing by Leonardo da Vinci, c.1507–1510

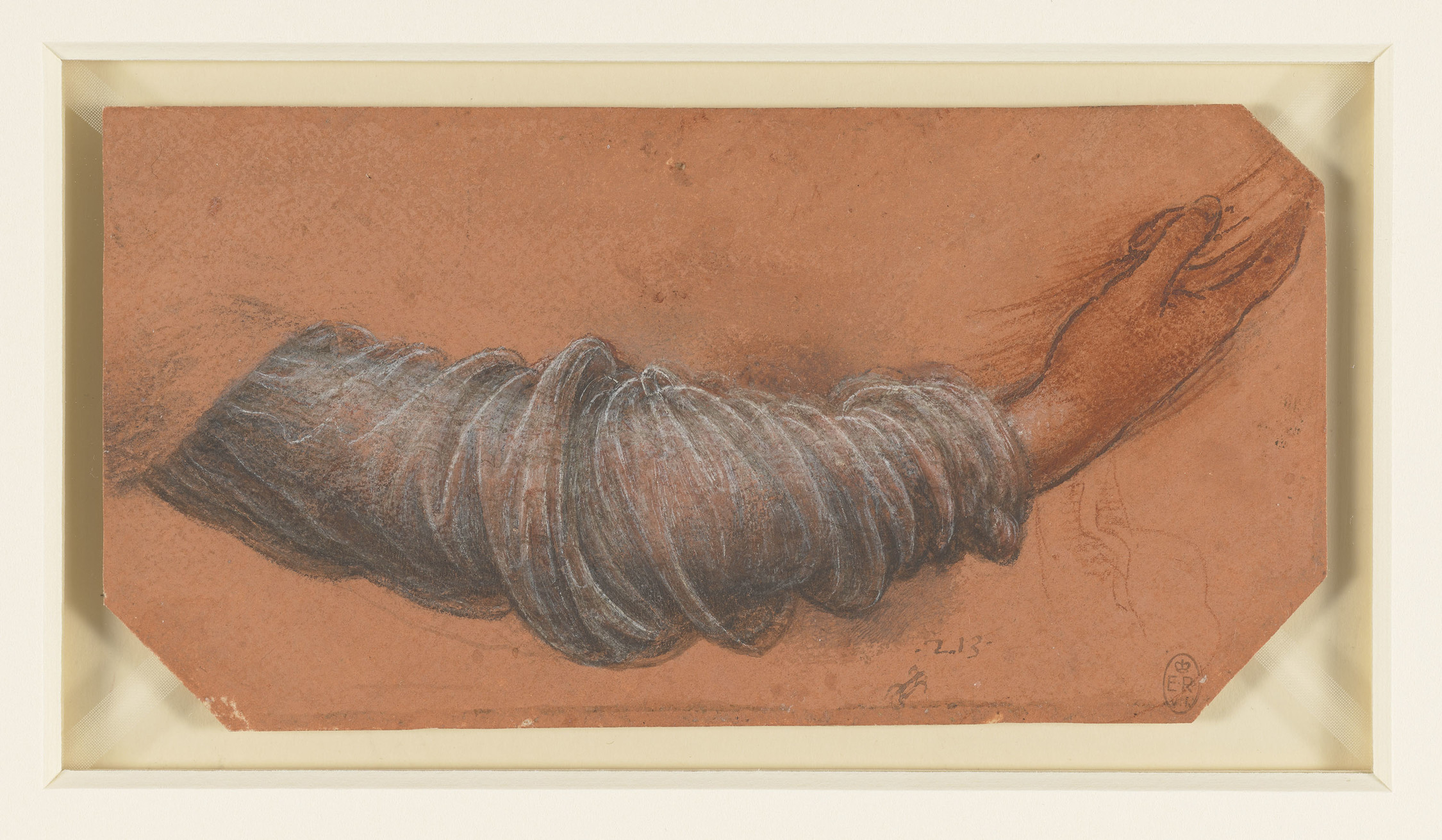
- Artist: Leonardo da Vinci
- Year: c. 1507–1510
- Medium: Red and black chalk, grey wash, white gouache highlights, pen and brown ink, on orange-red prepared paper.
- Dimensions: 8.6 cm × 17.0 cm (3.4 in × 6.7 in)
- Location: Windsor Castle, Windsor (United Kingdom)
- Accession: INV 912532

The Study for the Virgin's Right Arm is a drawing by the Florentine painter Leonardo da Vinci that is kept at Windsor Castle in the United Kingdom. It is drawn in charcoal or black stone, grey chalk, ink, and white gouache highlights on red-tinted paper.

Probably created between 1507 and 1510, the drawing is a preparatory study for the draped arm of the Virgin Mary in the painting The Virgin and Child with Saint Anne in the Musée du Louvre. It belongs to a series of studies, most of which date from the beginning of the painting's creation in 1502–1503, each dedicated to one of its details.

The motif represents the artist's virtuosity, the result of years of technical research into materials and scientific research into light and shade, so that it appears both as a substantial improvement on the original motif and as evidence of the evolution of the painter's technical skills since his beginnings.

== Description ==
The Study for the Virgin's Right Arm is based on a rectangular piece of paper, 8.6 × 17.0 cm, prepared in orange-red chalk. Three of its corners have been cut off, and according to its value in Francesco Melzi's collection, this paper is numbered 213.

The drawing is traced in charcoal or black stone, then repeated in nib and ink, it is coloured with grey chalk, followed by a wash of brown ink, with highlights of white gouache and some hatching in red chalk. Also, it features a drape depicting a thin, transparent cloth enveloping a person's right arm. The hand facing upwards is almost entirely shaded, holding what appears to be a cloth. While the hand is depicted, the shoulder, which includes the rest of the woman's clothing, appears only as a faint sketch in black stone.

== History ==
=== Context of creation ===
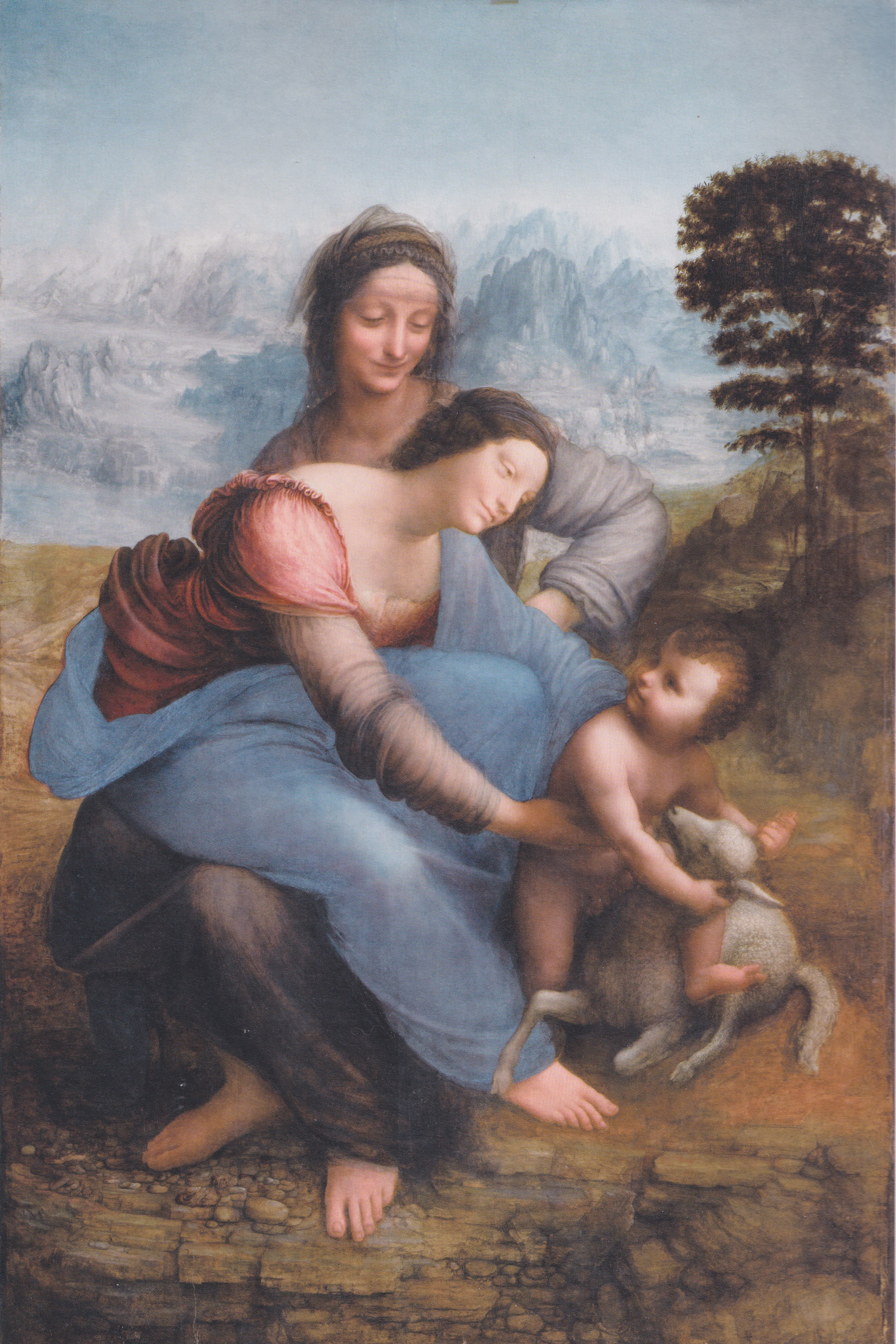
The drawing was created as part of The Virgin and Child with Saint Anne (1503–1519, Musée du Louvre, n° inv. 776).

Leonardo da Vinci was about fifty-five years old when he created the Study for the Virgin's Right Arm around 1507–1510. In 1508, he began what is known as his "second Milanese period", which lasted until September 1513. He was famous not only in Italy but throughout Europe, and powerful patrons competed for his services as an engineer and artist, including King Louis XII of France and his subordinates – his Secretary of State, Florimond Robertet, and the governor he had sent to Milan, Charles d'Amboise. Leonardo da Vinci, who had fled from the French when the Duchy of Milan was invaded in 1499, finally entered the King's service in 1507.

Although Leonardo da Vinci self-proclaimed his distance from painting, he produced several works during this period: Salvator Mundi (after 1507), La Scapigliata (1508), Leda and the Swan (1508). Since the turn of the century, he had also been working on a "Trinitarian Saint Anne", although it is not yet clear who commissioned it: the work now in the Louvre, begun in 1502–1503, was certainly still in draft form around 1507–1508 since the painter most likely abandoned it between 1504 and 1507.

Two types of studies are directly related to this painting: those that enabled the creation of the painting board and those that constitute "the final changes decided by the master" and are therefore the furthest removed in time from it. The drawing for the Study for the Virgin's Right Arm, with the technique so typical of his work, belongs firmly to this second group. By this time, the painting was sufficiently advanced that it was no longer possible for Leonardo to modify the overall composition. His task was therefore to execute and perfect the details, including the drapery of the figures and the rocks surrounding them: he thus executed a dozen studies (including the Study for the Virgin's Right Arm) to refine what had initially been on the painting board.

Other preparatory drawings for The Virgin and Child with Saint Anne and contemporary with the Study for the Virgin's Right Arm

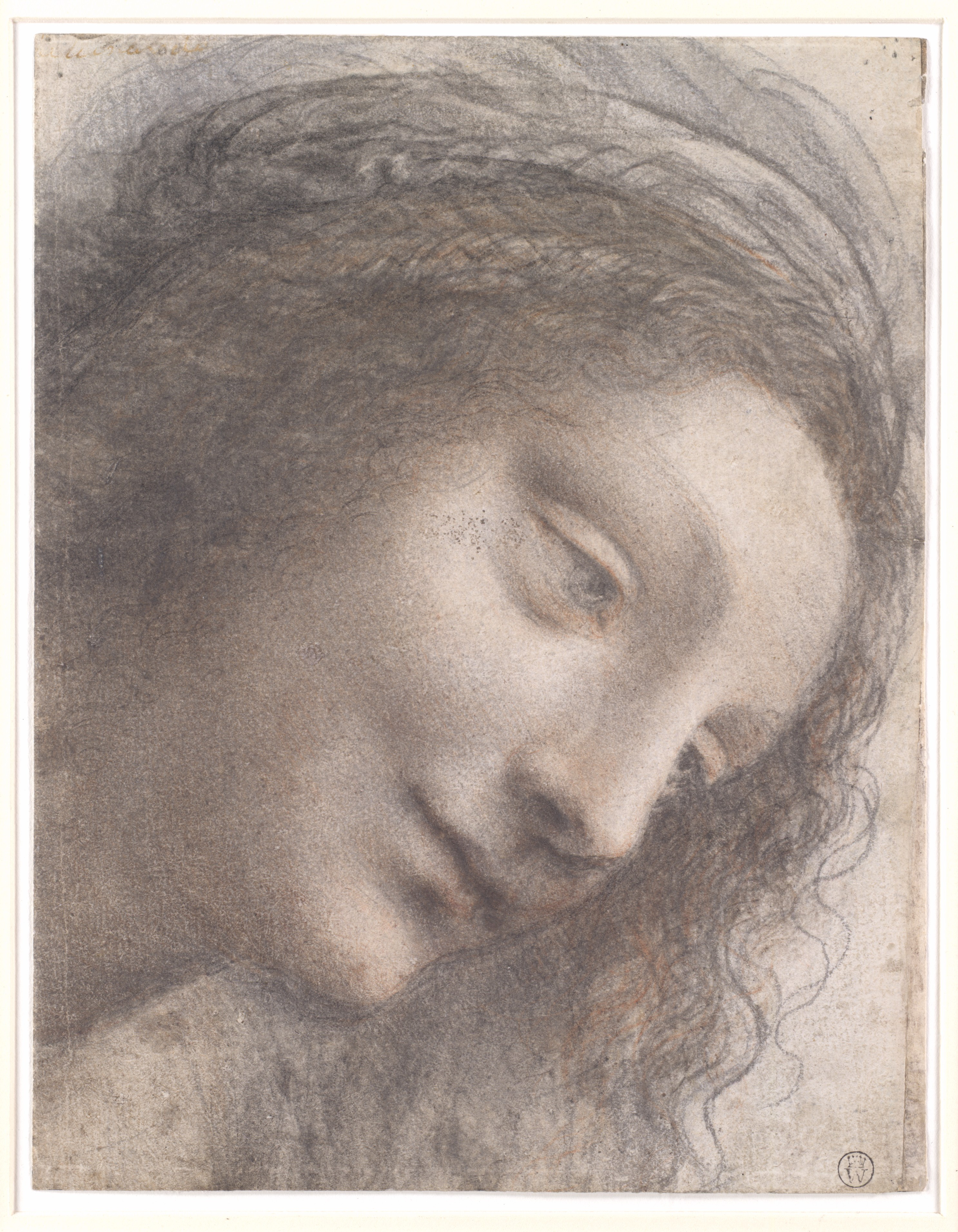
The Head of the Virgin in Three-Quarter View Facing Right, between 1507 and 1513, New York, Metropolitan Museum of Art, inv.1951 51.90

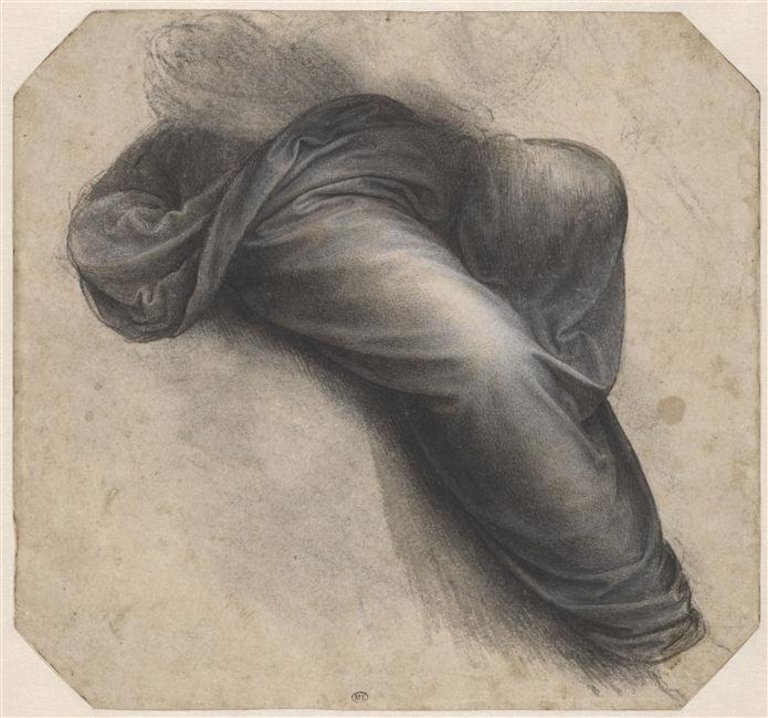
Study for the Virgin's Right Arm around 1510-1513, Paris, Department of Graphic Arts, Musée du Louvre, INV 2257

=== Date Range ===
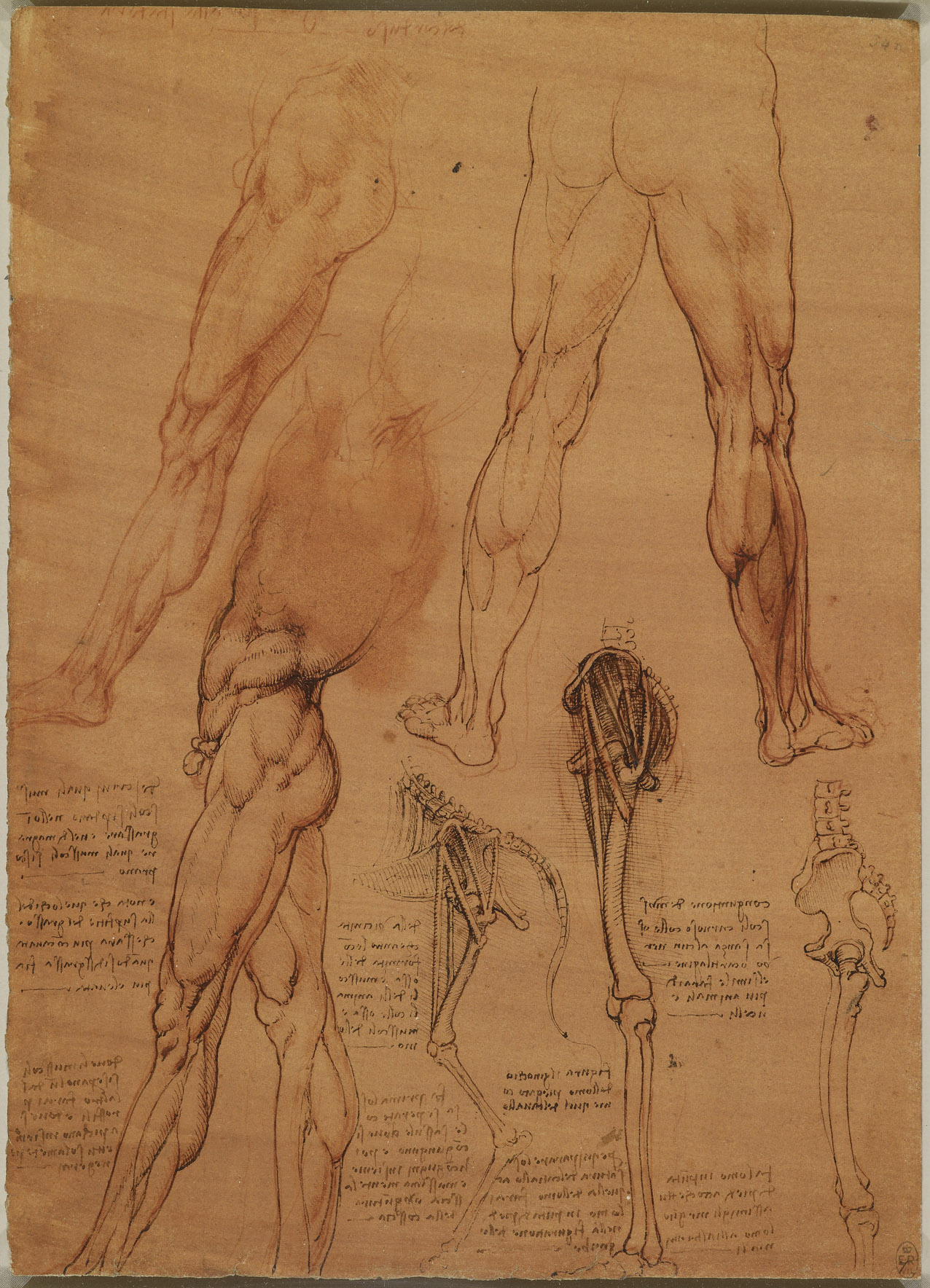
Leonardo da Vinci, Étude d'anatomie comparative de jambes d'homme et de pattes de cheval, around 1506–1508, Windsor Castle, n° RCIN 912625.

The research of art historians shows that the drawing belongs to the late studies for the painting, as indicated by the use of a technique characteristic of this period, particularly in the Étude pour le drapé de la Vierge.

While Vincent Delieuvin suggests a date "around 1507–1510", Françoise Viatte and Carmen Bambach suggest "around 1508–1510". They rely on a technical comparison with a study of human and animal anatomy preserved at Windsor Castle under reference n° RCIN 12625: "The similar use of this technique reworked in nib and dark brown ink for the comparative anatomical study of human and equine legs may constitute a terminus post quem for the present work. The subtle pictorial effects of this Windsor drawing correspond in Leonardo's career to his later optical studies". Frank Zöllner and Johannes Nathan, for example, put the date "around 1501 – 1510 (?)".

=== Attribution and path of the artwork ===
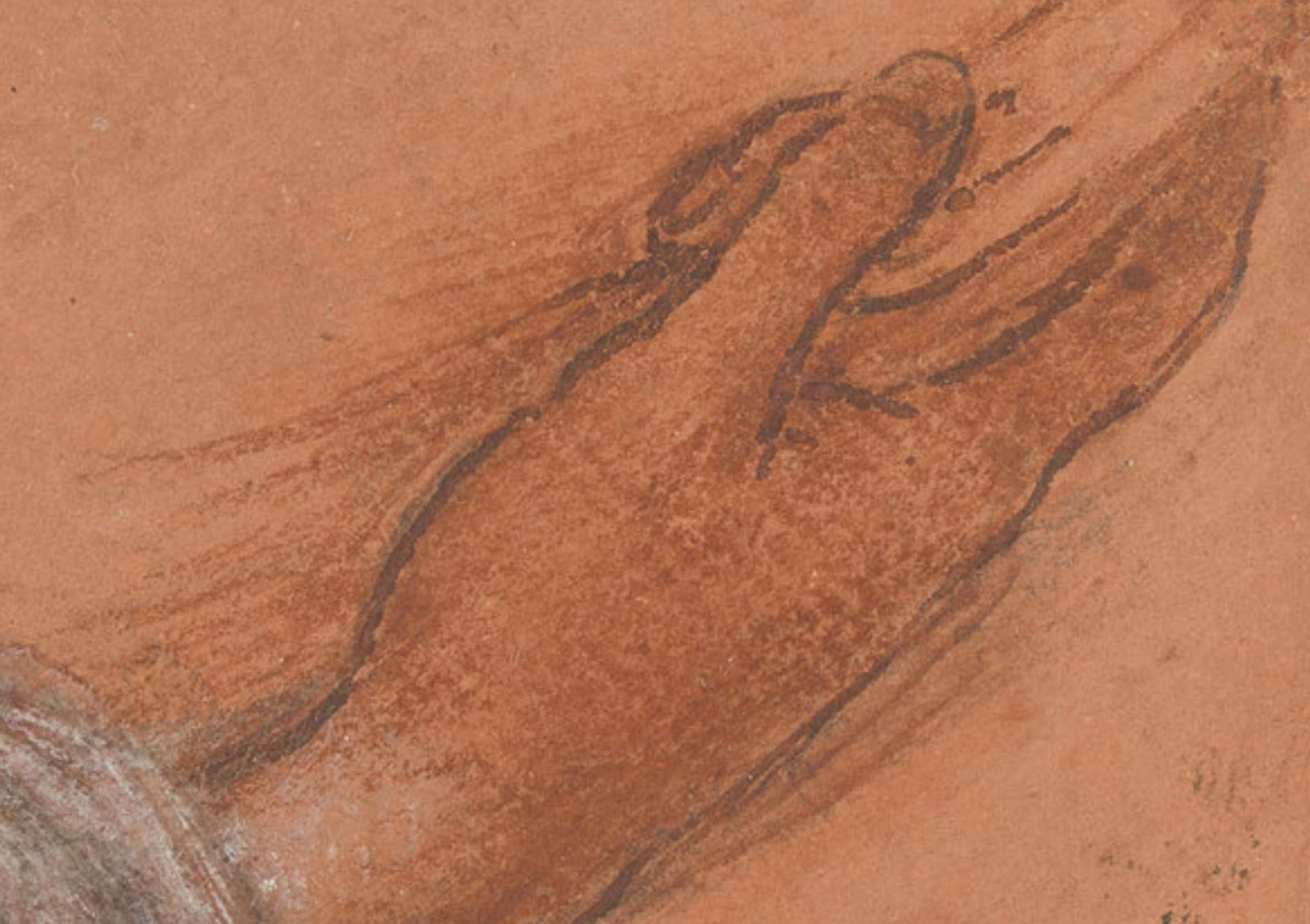
Detail on the hand: the typical left-handed hatching is visible.

The Study for the Virgin's Right Arm is undoubtedly attributed to Leonardo da Vinci, based on the presence of typical left-hand hatching in sanguine. However, as argued by Carlo Pedretti and Kenneth Clark, and as noted on the website of the work's owner, it could have been retouched by someone else, especially the model's hand.

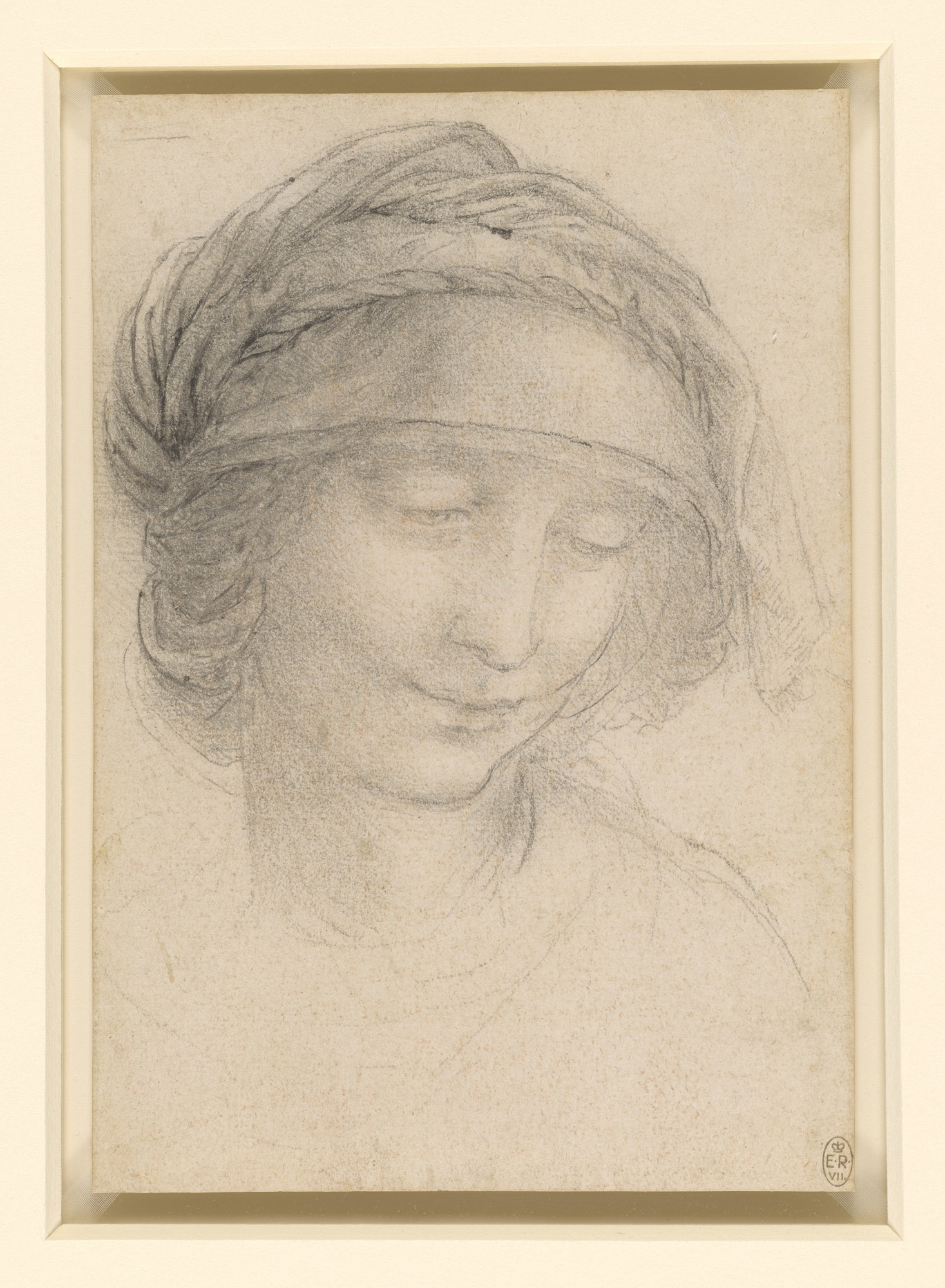
When the artist died, the drawing followed the path of the Study for The Head of the Virgin in Three-Quarter View Facing Right (around 1502 – 1503, UK, Windsor Castle, RCIN 912533).

The Study for the Virgin's Right Arm was part of the Melzi-Leoni Collection, a group of drawings and manuscripts by Leonardo da Vinci inherited by Francesco Melzi at his death in 1519 and dispersed by his son Orazio at his father's death in 1570. After a period of dispersion, this collection (including the drawing) was largely reassembled between 1582 and 1590 by Pompeo Leoni, who kept it in Madrid. Subsequently, after a period in Milan, the drawing arrived in London in the 1630s, in the collections of Thomas Howard, 14th Earl of Arundel, who had managed to acquire the second great compendium compiled by Pompeo Leoni and known today as the "Codex Windsor". Probably acquired by the British monarch Charles II, it was finally added to the Royal Collection at least as early as 1690 and appears in the inventory of the collection of the British King George III around 1810. It has been kept at Windsor Castle ever since.

== A study for The Virgin and Child with Saint Anne ==
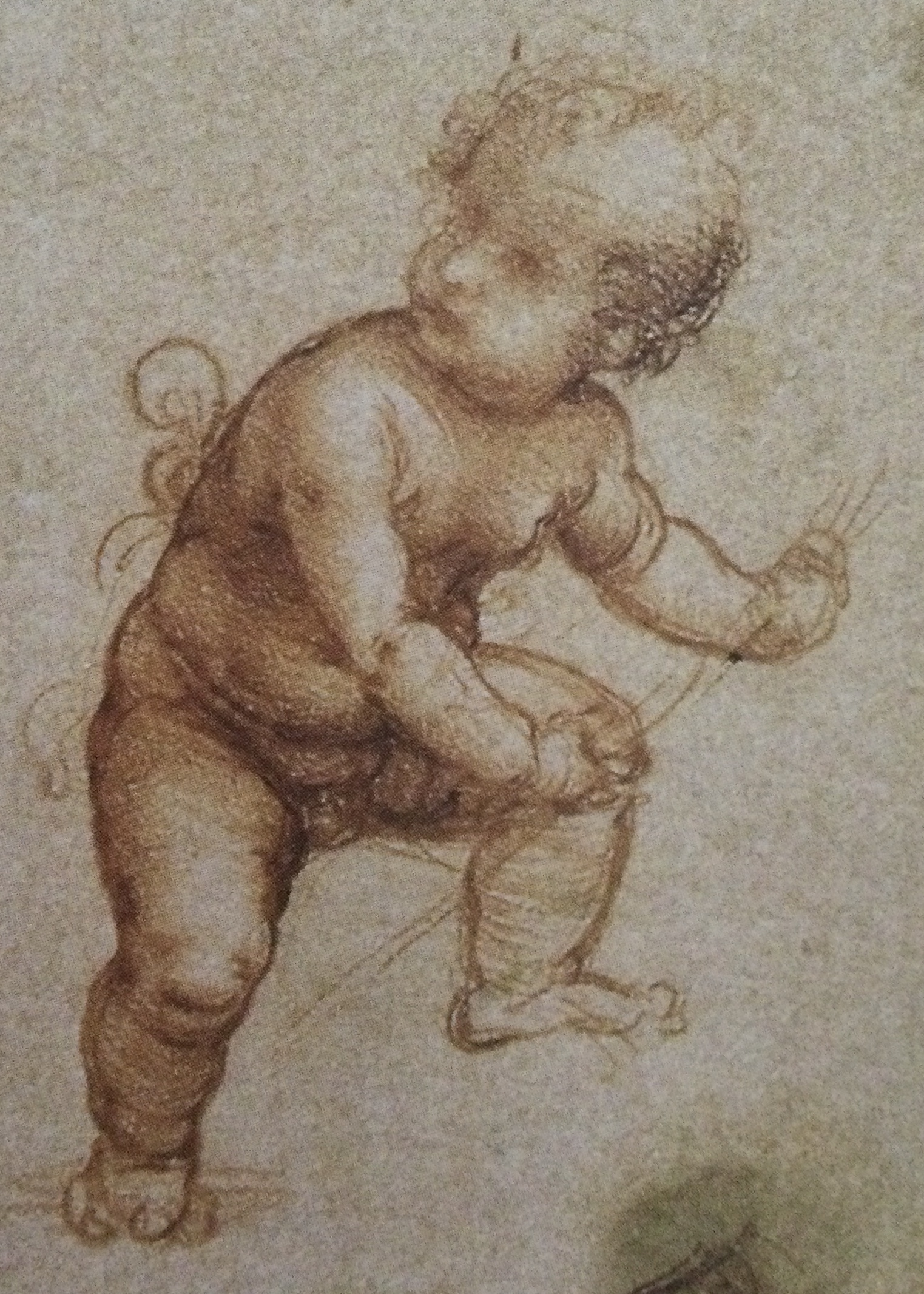
Études pour l'Enfant Jésus (detail in the drawing at top left), around 1502–1503, Venice, Gallerie dell'Accademia, n°inv. 257.

The drawing Study for the Virgin's Right Arm is inextricably linked to the creation of the painting The Virgin and Child with Saint Anne, of which it constitutes a study.

It was created at a time when the painter was working on his painting as a second intention, after a period of relative neglect during which he had devoted himself to other projects. The work was too far advanced to change the overall composition: Leonardo da Vinci could only modify the details. In the case of this study, he was interested in the draping effects of the slightly transparent veil that he wanted to give to the Virgin's garment, a garment that he now wanted to be more refined. This work on the young woman's arm and the drapery it supports is fundamental to the painting as an element that "plays a structural role in the composition of the painting, whose diagonal movement it supports". As for the hand, the painter chose to use a technique known as "red on red", which allowed him to "study more subtly the effects of light and shadow on the flesh tone".

Some of the ornaments depicted later disappear from the painting, for example, what appears to be a knot just below the wrist is visible in the underdrawing of the painting thanks to infrared reflectography, but it disappears from the final result.

Conversely, in his study of the cloth covering the young woman's shoulder, the painter ignores it and simply sketches it in black stone. He seems to be satisfied with the one transferred from the preparatory painting board of 1503 since he retains it. At the other end, he precisely draws the young woman's hand and has her hold a cloth: perhaps he imagines that the mother is holding her son by a band of cloth wrapped around his body. However, the same cloth can be seen in one of the drawings of the Études pour l'Enfant Jésus in the Gallerie dell'Accademia in Venice – a series of studies dating from 1503, much earlier than the Study for the Virgin's Right Arm. In Leonardo's mind, therefore, the two drawings would have been complementary, more than five years apart. But this idea never seems to have been transferred to the painting.

Ultimately, the entire motif was taken up by members of the painter's studio for their versions of Saint Anne. These replicas – which Serge Bramly calls "prototypes" – were commissioned by the master, who used them to create his painting: by varying the details of the figures and the landscape, they served as tests to judge the overall rendering of his future work. As such, they bear witness to the progress of the painter's thinking about his future work.

Comparison of the study and its realisation in the painting

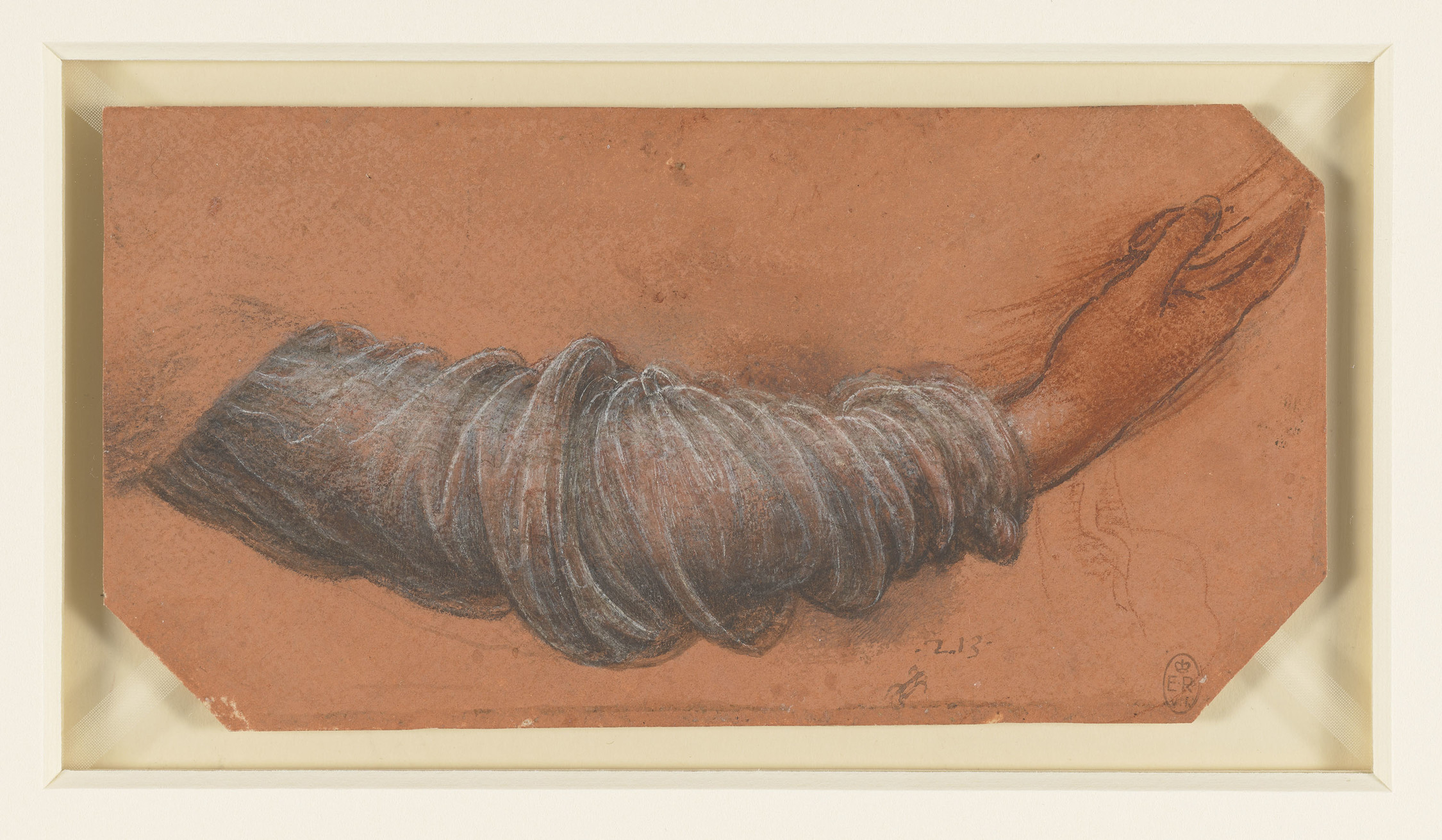
Study for the Virgin's Right Arm

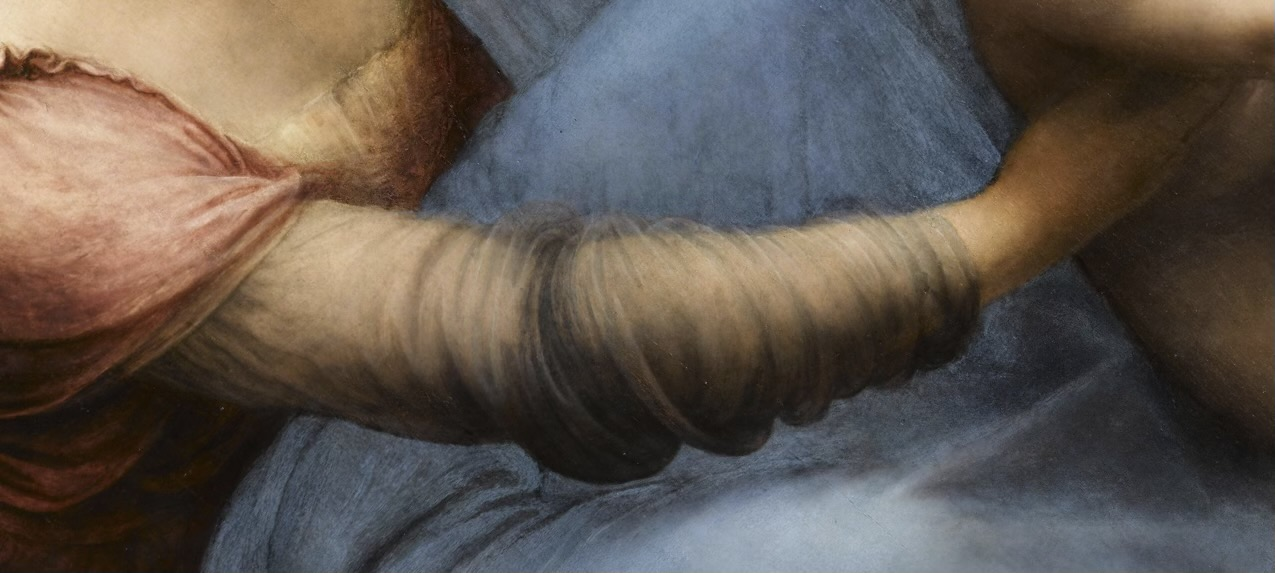
The arm of the Virgin in The Virgin and Child with Saint Anne (details, 1503-1519, Paris, Musée du Louvre, n° inv. 776).

== Analysis ==
=== The fusion of materials ===
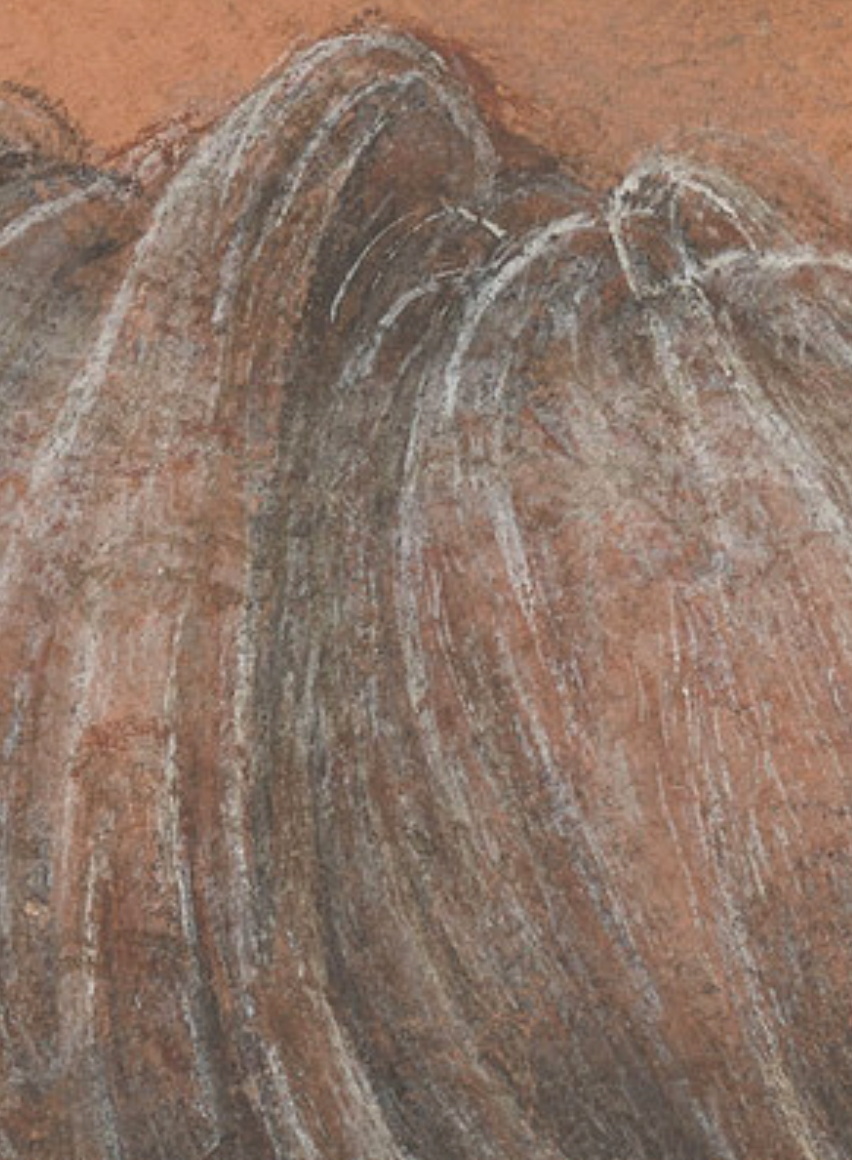
Detail of drapery: black stone, grey chalk, brown ink wash and white gouache in glazes blend densely and intricately.

The drawing for the Study for the Virgin's Right Arm, like the later studies for the painting, is highly pictorial thanks to the variety of materials used and the richness and complexity of his technique. The aim is to simulate as closely as possible the effect that will be obtained in the painting, both for his own work and for his assistants who will make copies.

The painter began by preparing his sheet of paper with a red-orange chalk background. He first outlines the shapes with charcoal or black stone, then creates a background on the paper with grey chalk. He rubs the material (charcoal and black stone) to obtain blurring effects and thus a sfumato effect in the intermediate shadows. He continues this modelling work with a grey wash for deeper shadows. He marks the folds with a nib in dark brown ink. At this point, he added highlights in white gouache to mark the edges of the folds. "A few strokes of sanguine [are] also applied, often parallel to the white highlights.

=== The art of drapery ===
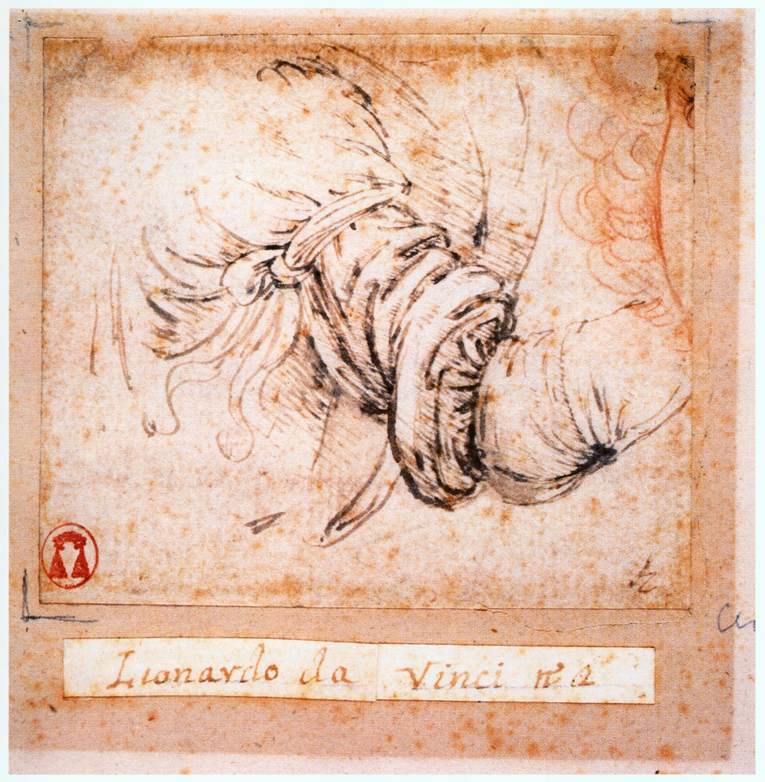
The drapery art of Leonardo da Vinci has evolved since the beginning of his career (Study of drapery for Annunciation, between 1470 and 1473, Oxford University, Christ Church).

The drapery on the Virgin's right arm is one of the most significant features of the Louvre painting, and the painter paid particular attention to it: what was on the original painting board a "simple cloth" became, during the detailed retouching phases from 1508 onwards, "a transparent fabric, arranged in numerous circular folds, treated with virtuosity".

It must be said that the painter's virtuosity in depicting drapery had been honed since it marked the culmination of his scientific research into colour, form, light, and shadow, as well as the technical combination of materials: Thus, "in his drapery studies for the Louvre composition, the artist experimented with resolutely unexpected, if not always successful, combinations of materials – at least different in color and composition – to obtain luminous, chromatically saturated, coherently constructed modeling effects".

The drapery of the Virgin's arm is representative of the delicate rendering of these works. The painter's virtuosity allows him to give the Virgin's garment a refinement that he didn't seem to have imagined at the beginning of the project, giving it the appearance, lightness and silkiness of gauze.

== Bibliography ==
- Bramly, Serge (2019). "Comme une journée bien remplie". Léonard de Vinci: Une biographie (in French). Paris: JC Lattès. pp. 503–587. ISBN 978-2709663236.
- Bambach, Carmen C., ed. (2003). "Entries". Leonardo da Vinci: Master Draftsman. New York: The Metropolitan Museum of Art; New Haven: Yale University Press. pp. 242–722.
- Delieuvin, Vincent; Barbe, Françoise; Beuzelin, Cécile; Chui, Sue Ann; Curie, Pierre; Eveno, Myriam; Foucart-Walter, Élisabeth; Frank, Louis; Frozinini, Cecilia; et al. (Ana Gonzalez Mozo, Sophie Guillot de Suduiraut, Claurio Gulli, Bruno Mottin, Cinzia Pasquali, Alan Phenix, Cristina Quattrini, Élisabeth Ravaud, Cécile Scailliérez and Naoko Takahatake) (2012). "Étude pour le bras de la Vierge". In Delieuvin, Vincent (ed.). La Sainte Anne : L'ultime chef-d'œuvre de Léonard de Vinci (catalogue de l’exposition au musée du Louvre, du 29 mars au 25 juin 2012) (in French). Louvre éditions. p. 142. ISBN 978-8-88985-487-7.
- Frank, Louis; Delieuvin, Vincent (2019). "167 Étude pour la Sainte Anne : le visage de la Vierge". Léonard de Vinci: 1452–1519 (Livret distribué au visiteur de l’exposition au musée du Louvre, du 24 octobre 2019 au 24 février 2020) (in French). Musée du Louvre. ISBN 978-2-85088-725-3.
- Delieuvin, Vincent; Frank, Louis; Bastian, Gilles; Bellec, Jean-Louis; Bellucci, Roberto; Calligaro, Thomas; Eveno, Myriam; Frosinini, Cecilia; Laval, Éric; et al. (Mottin, Bruno; Pichon, Laurent; Ravaud, Élisabeth; Bohl, Thomas; Couilleaux, Benjamin; Jatta, Barbara; Laugier, Ludovic; Marani, Pietro C.; Thiébaut, Dominique; Tullio Cataldo, Stefania; & Villela-Petit, Inès) (2019). "Mélancolie et joie". Léonard de Vinci (in French). Paris-Vanves: Louvre éditions – Éditions Hazan|Hazan. pp. 258–289. ISBN 978-2-7541-1123-2.
- Viatte, Françoise; Forcione, Varena; Bambach, Carmen; Bora, Giulio; La Chapelle, Ariane de; Logan, Anne-Marie; Marani, Pietro C.; Mason, Rainer Michael; Py, Bernadette; et al. (Elisabeth Ravaud, Cécile Scailliérez, Carlo Vecce, Linda Wolk-Simon) (2003). "85 Étude d'un bras droit drapé". Léonard de Vinci: dessins et manuscrits (catalogue de l’exposition au musée du Louvre, du 5 mai au 14 juillet 2003) (in French). Paris: Réunion des musées nationaux. p. 257. ISBN 9782711845897.
- Zöllner, Frank (2000). Léonard de Vinci, 1452-1519 (in French). Translated by Jacqueline Kirchner. Cologne: Taschen. pp. 60–69. ISBN 978-3-8228-6179-0.
- Zöllner, Frank (August 8, 2017). Léonard de Vinci, 1452-1519 : Tout l'œuvre peint (in French). Cologne: Taschen. ISBN 978-3-8365-6296-6.
- Zöllner, Frank; Nathan, Johannes (2016). Léonard de Vinci, 1452-1519 : L'œuvre graphique (in French). Cologne: Taschen. ISBN 978-3-8365-5440-4.
