= The Virgin and Child with Saint Anne (Leonardo) =

Unfinished painting by Leonardo da Vinci

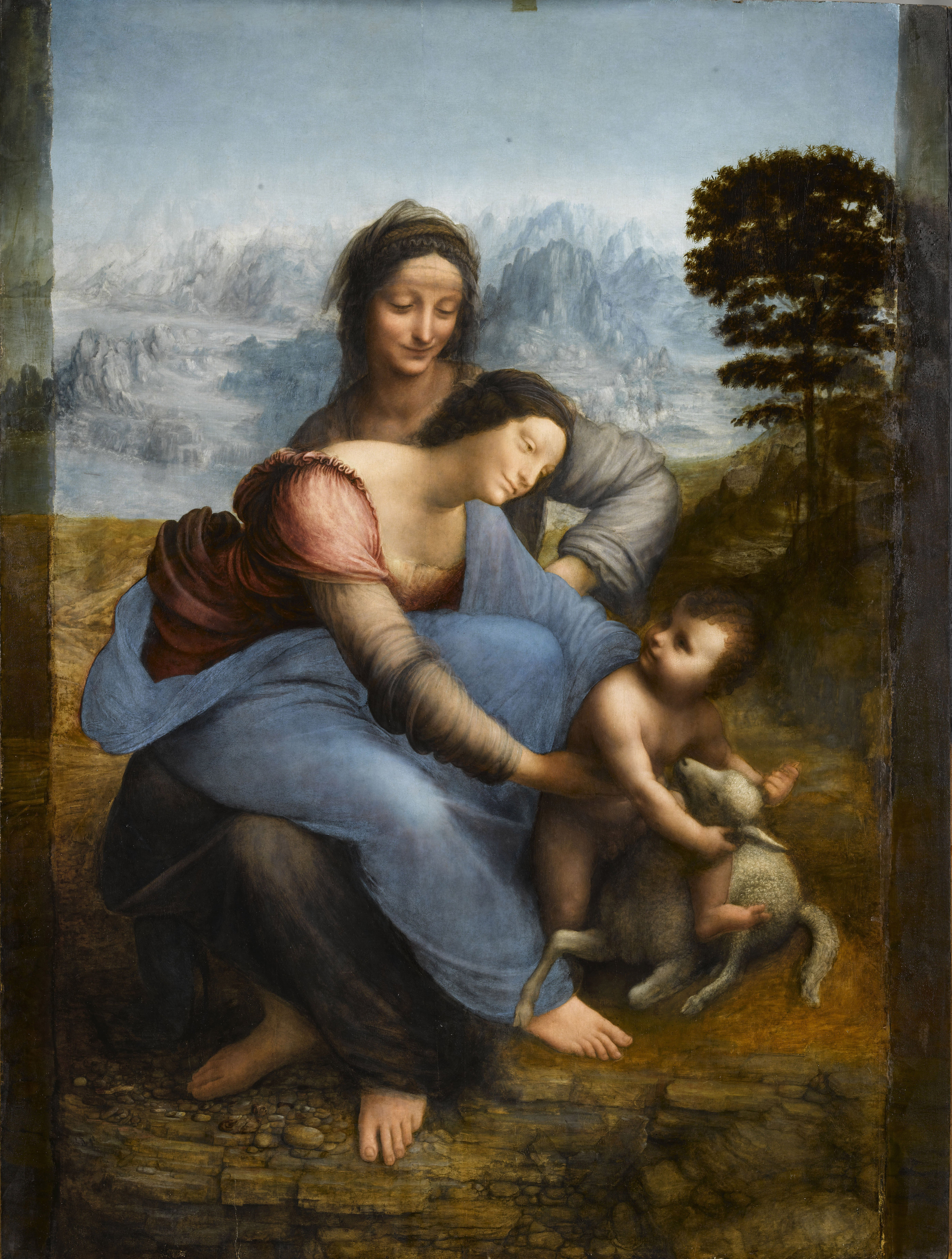
- Artist: Leonardo da Vinci
- Year: c. 1501–1519
- Medium: Oil on wood
- Subject: Virgin and Child with Saint Anne
- Dimensions: 130 cm × 168.4 cm (51 in × 66.3 in)
- Location: Louvre, Paris
- Accession: INV 776

The Virgin and Child with Saint Anne (Italian: Sant'Anna, la Vergine e il Bambino con l'agnellino) is an unfinished oil painting by High Renaissance artist Leonardo da Vinci, dated to c. 1501–1519. (Note: Scholars date the painting to 1501–1519: Kemp (2019, p. 161): c. 1508–1516; Marani (2003, p. 340): c. 1510–1513; Syson et al. (2011, p. 70): c. 1501 onwards; Zöllner (2019, p. 244): c. 1503–1519) It depicts Saint Anne, her daughter the Virgin Mary and the infant Jesus. Christ is shown grasping a sacrificial lamb symbolizing his Passion. The painting was commissioned as the high altarpiece for the Church of Santissima Annunziata in Florence and its theme had long preoccupied Leonardo.

== History ==
It is likely that the painting was commissioned by King Louis XII of France following the birth of his daughter in 1499, but never delivered to him. Leonardo probed into incorporating these figures together by drawing the Burlington House Cartoon (National Gallery). In 2008, a curator at the Louvre discovered several faint sketches believed to have been made by Leonardo on the back of the painting. Infrared reflectography was used to reveal a "7–by–4 inch drawing of a horse's head", which had a resemblance to sketches of horses that Leonardo had made previously before drawing The Battle of Anghiari. Also revealed was a second sketch 6 1/2 inch–by–4 inch depiction of half a skull. A third sketch showed the infant Jesus playing with a lamb, which sketch was similar to that which is painted on the front side. The Louvre spokesperson said that the sketches were "very probably" made by Leonardo and that it was the first time that any drawing had been found on the "flip side of one of his works". The drawings will be further studied by a group of experts as the painting undergoes restoration.

== Content and composition ==
The painting shows the Virgin Mary, sitting on the knee of her mother Saint Anne, and reaching out to baby Jesus who is playing with a lamb. Art historian Tom Gurney describes "a joyful atmosphere within the painting, as the two women enjoy the sweetness of the young boy who looks on for guidance from his mother."

Academic Michael Alan Anderson describes the painting:

"In this well-known work of astonishing realism, the lineage of Jesus is vividly expressed as Mary is seated on the lap of a relatively young St. Anne. Both women gaze at the Christ Child, whose hand grasps the Lamb of God. Visually interlocked with her mother, Mary attempts to restrain her son as he clutches the sacrificial Lamb."

== Freud's interpretation ==
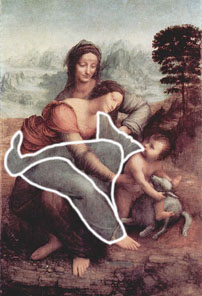
The "vulture" theorized by Freud

Sigmund Freud undertook a psychoanalytic examination of Leonardo in his 1910 essay Leonardo da Vinci, A Memory of His Childhood. According to Freud, the Virgin's garment reveals a vulture when viewed sideways. Freud claimed that this was a manifestation of a "passive homosexual" childhood fantasy that Leonardo wrote about in the Codex Atlanticus, in which he recounts being attacked as an infant in his crib by the tail of a vulture. Freud translated the passage thus:

"It seems that I was always destined to be so deeply concerned with vultures – for I recall as one of my very earliest memories that while I was in my cradle, a vulture came down to me, and opened my mouth with its tail, and struck me many times with its tail against my lips."

Unfortunately for Freud, the word 'vulture' was a mistranslation by the German translator of the Codex and the bird that Leonardo imagined was in fact a kite, a bird of prey which is also occasionally a scavenger. This disappointed Freud because, as he confessed to Lou Andreas-Salomé, he regarded Leonardo as "the only beautiful thing I have ever written". Some Freudian scholars have, however, made attempts to repair the theory by incorporating the kite.

Another theory proposed by Freud attempts to explain Leonardo's fondness of depicting the Virgin Mary with Saint Anne. Leonardo was raised by his biological mother initially before being "adopted" by the wife of his father Ser Piero. The idea of depicting the Mother of God with her own mother was therefore particularly close to Leonardo's heart, because he, in a sense, had "two mothers" himself. In both versions of the composition (the Louvre painting and the London cartoon) it is hard to discern whether Saint Anne is a full generation older than Mary.

Erich Neumann rebutted this essay in the first essay in Art and the Creative Unconscious (1959), Leonardo da Vinci and the Mother Archetype. Neumann disagreed with Freud's psychoanalytic interpretation of Leonardo's childhood memory and artistic motivations, which viewed Leonardo's creativity as the result of repressed sexuality and sublimation. Neumann counter-argued that Leonardo's themes should be understood through the Jungian framework of archetypes, particularly the Great Mother, and the Great Individual archetypes. Neumann further argued that art serves as a bridge between the conscious and unconscious mind, playing a crucial role in the development of individual and collective consciousness. The book analyzes the creative process in mythological and artistic traditions, viewing it as a key mechanism for psychological integration.

== 2011 cleaning controversy ==
On 7 October 2011 Le Journal des arts, a Paris art publication, reported that the restoration posed more danger to the painting than was previously expected. In late December 2011 and early January 2012 reports emerged that Ségolène Bergeon Langle, the former director of conservation for the Louvre and France's national museums, and Jean-Pierre Cuzin, the former director of paintings at the Louvre, both of the advisory committee supervising the painting's restoration, had resigned over a painting cleaning controversy, with critics claiming that the painting has been damaged by being cleaned so it became brighter than the artist ever intended. Other experts spoke out in favour of the cleaning treatment.

== See also ==
- List of works by Leonardo da Vinci
- Virgin and Child with Saint Anne – type of iconography
- The Virgin and Child with Saint Anne and Saint John the Baptist
- Studies of an Infant
- The Head of the Virgin in Three-Quarter View Facing Right
- Study for the Virgin's Right Arm
- Study for the Head of Saint Anne
- 100 Great Paintings, 1980 BBC series

== Sources ==
- Kemp, Martin (2019). Leonardo da Vinci: The 100 Milestones. New York: Sterling. ISBN 978-1-4549-304-26.
- Marani, Pietro C. (2003) [2000]. Leonardo da Vinci: The Complete Paintings. New York: Harry N. Abrams. ISBN 978-0-8109-3581-5.
- Syson, Luke; Keith, Larry; Galansino, Arturo; Mazzotta, Antoni; Nethersole, Scott; Rumberg, Per (2011). Leonardo da Vinci: Painter at the Court of Milan. London: National Gallery. ISBN 978-1-85709-491-6.
- Zöllner, Frank (2019) [2003]. Leonardo da Vinci: The Complete Paintings and Drawings (Anniversary ed.). Cologne: Taschen. ISBN 978-3-8365-7625-3.
