= Study (art) =

Practice artworks done as technical research

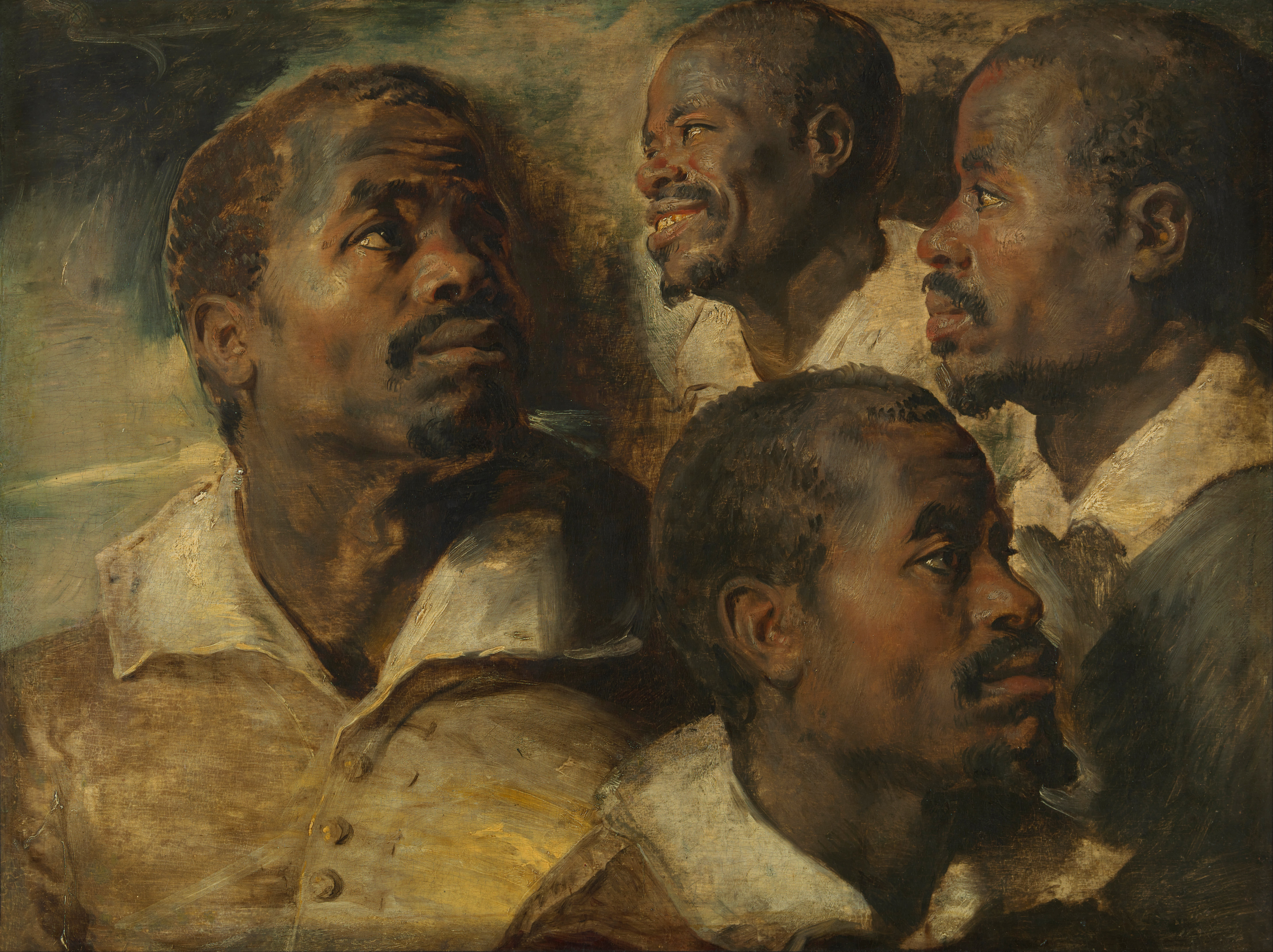
Peter Paul Rubens - Four Studies of a Head of a Moor

In art, a study is a drawing, sketch or painting done in preparation for a finished piece, as visual notes, or as practice. Studies are often used to understand the problems involved in rendering subjects and to plan the elements to be used in finished works, such as light, color, form, perspective and composition. Studies can have more impact than more-elaborately planned work, due to the fresh insights the artist gains while exploring the subject. The excitement of discovery can give a study vitality. When layers of the work show changes the artist made as more was understood, the viewer shares more of the artist's sense of discovery. Written notes alongside visual images add to the import of the piece as they allow the viewer to share the artist's process of getting to know the subject.

Studies inspired some of the first 20th century conceptual art, where the creative process itself becomes the subject of the piece. Since the process is what is all-important in studies and conceptual art, the viewer may be left with no material object of art.

Studies can be traced back even as long ago as the Italian Renaissance, from which art historians have maintained some of Michelangelo's studies. One in particular, his study for the Libyan Sibyl on the ceiling of the Sistine Chapel, is based on a male model, though the finished painting is of a woman. Such details help to reveal the thought processes and techniques of many artists.

Studies

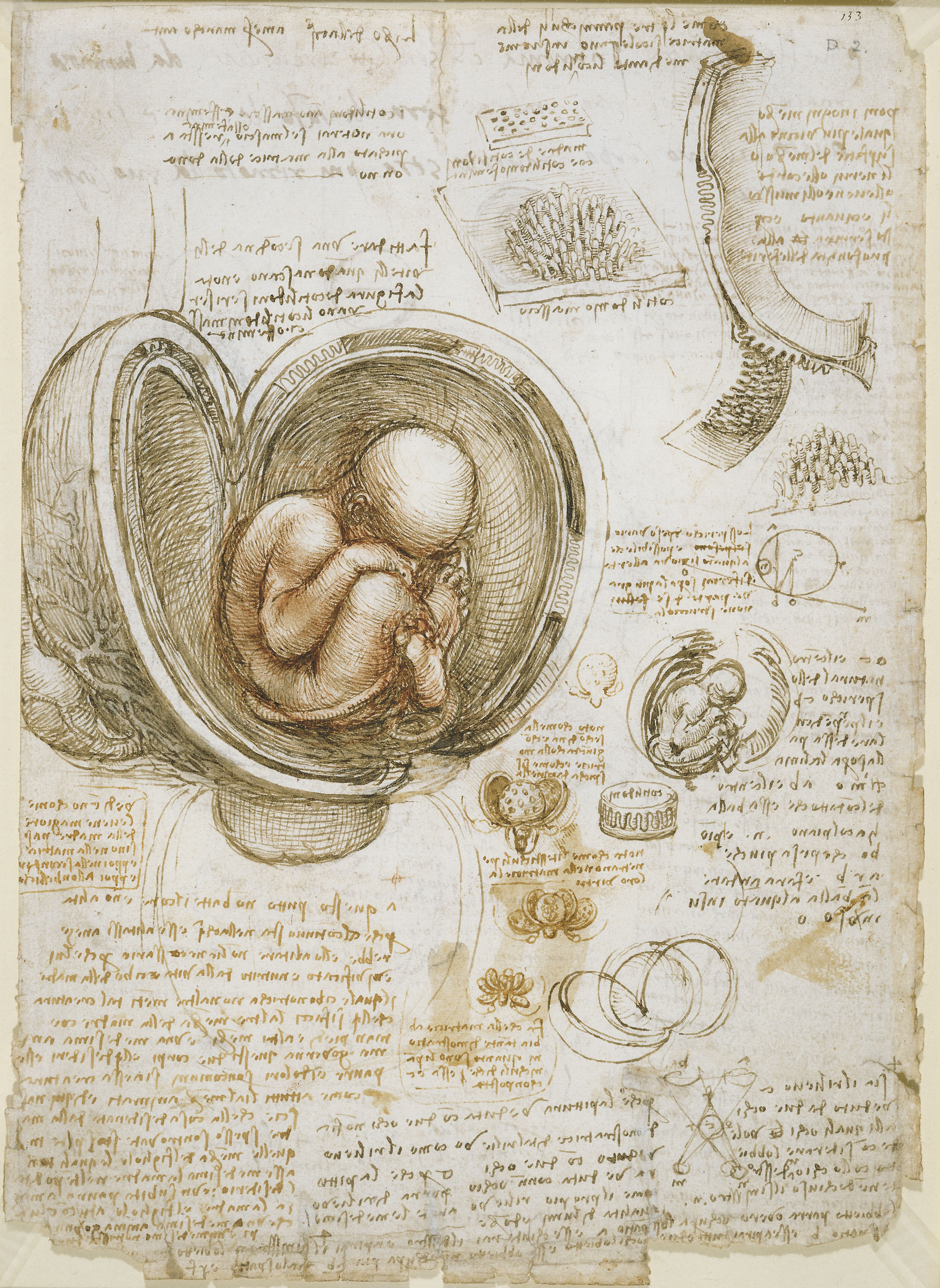
Leonardo da Vinci's study of embryos, c. 1510-1513

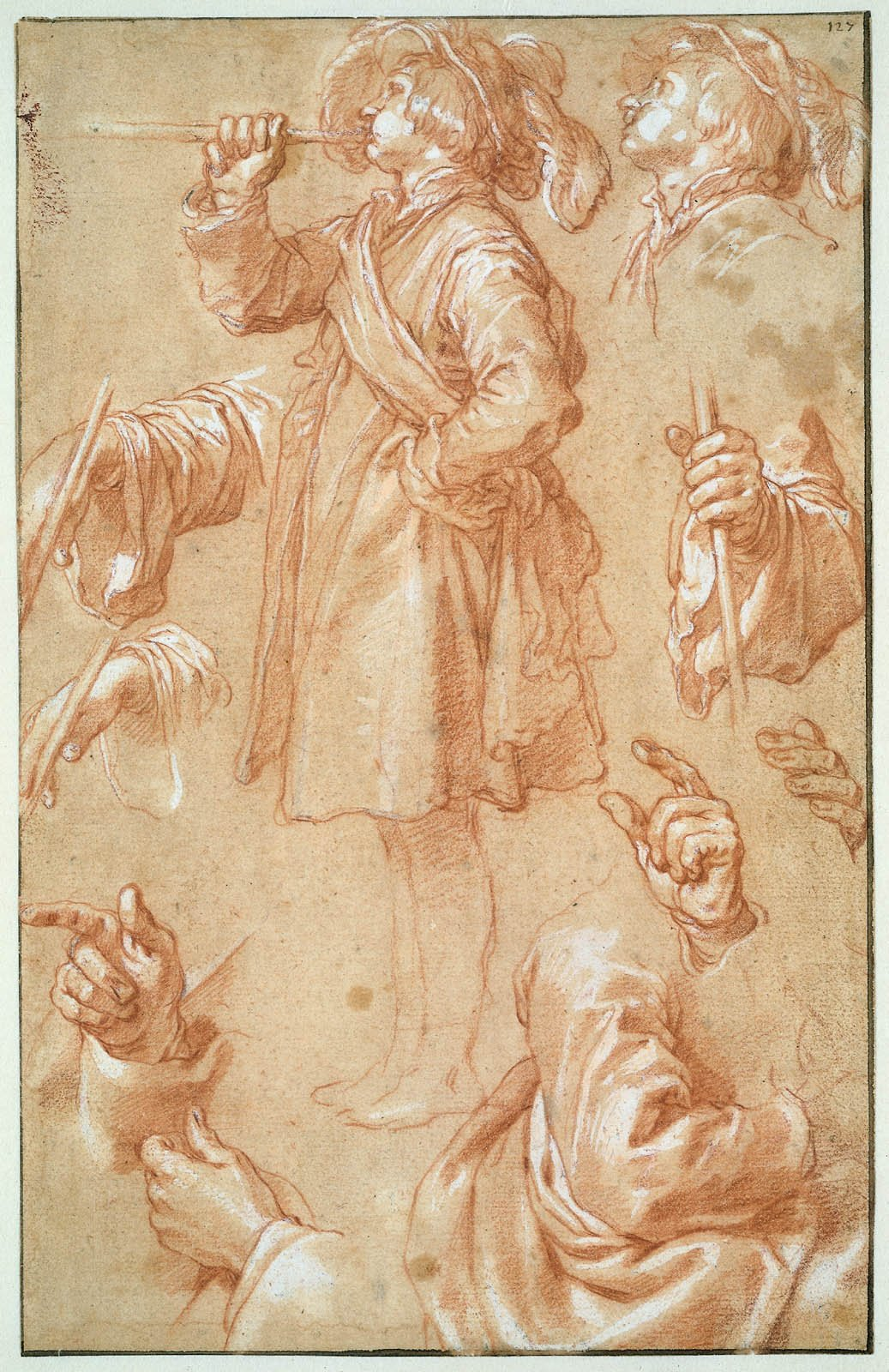
Studies by Abraham Bloemaert, ca. 1626

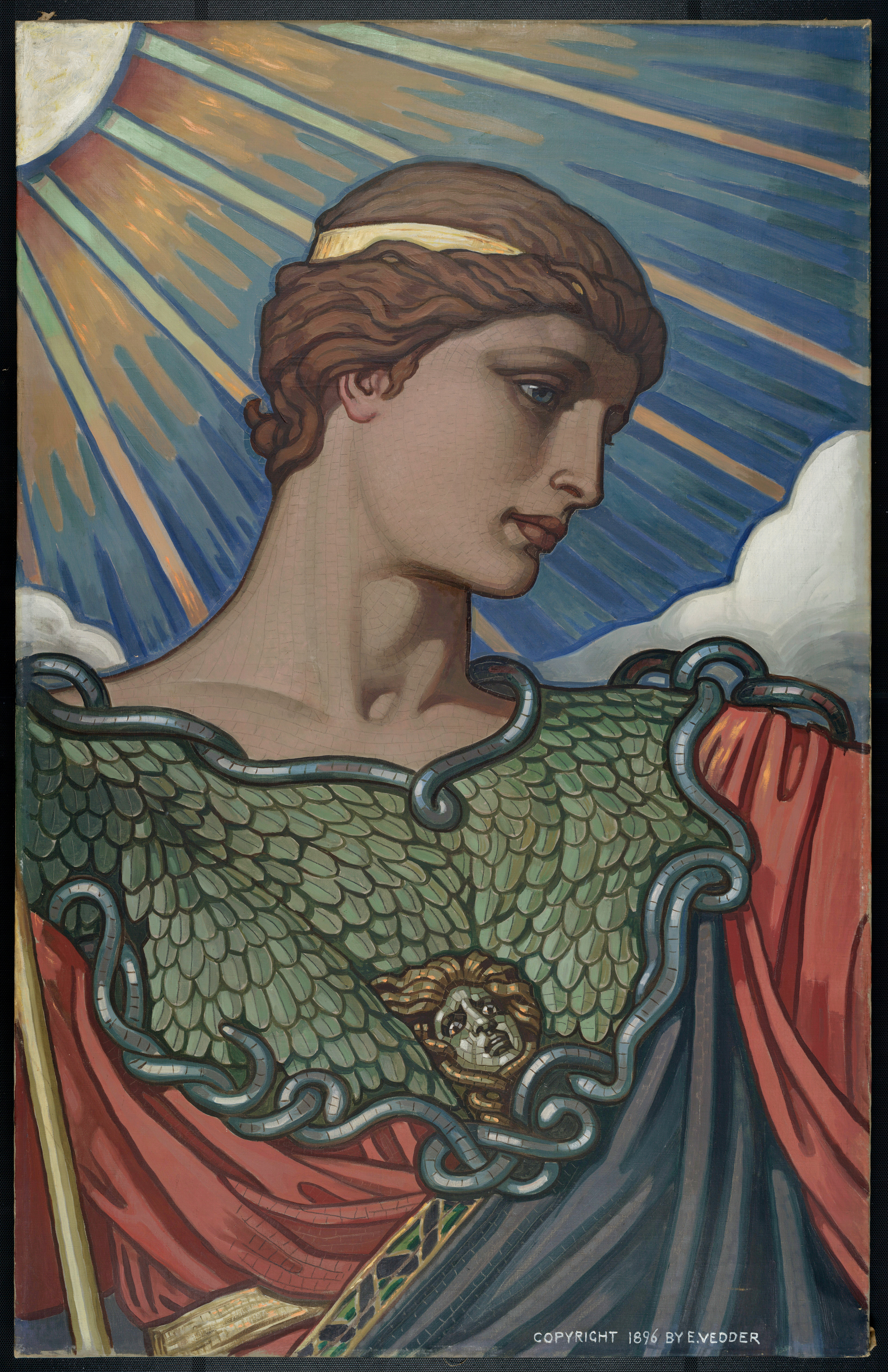
Head of Minerva, Elihu Vedder, 1896. Preparatory study. Oil on canvas, 125 × 80 cm

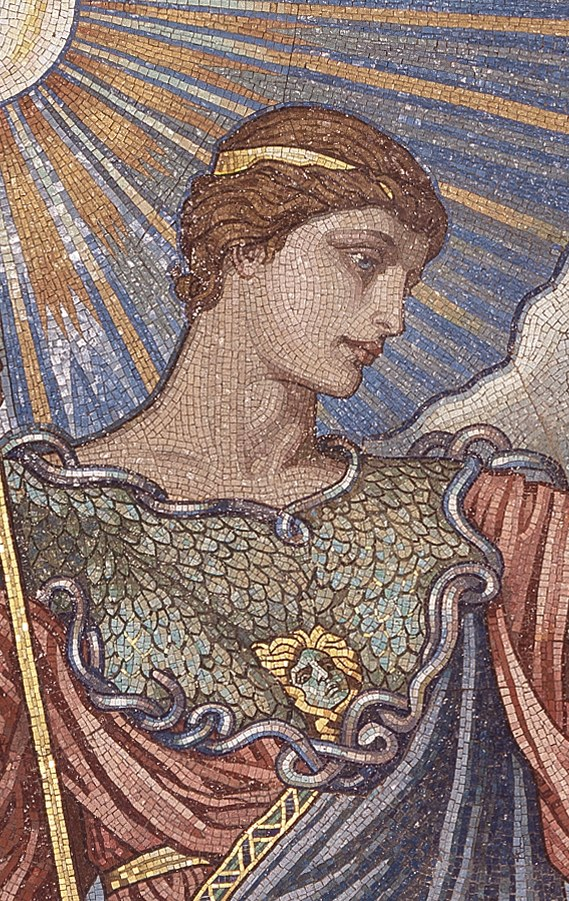
The corresponding final work, Elihu Vedder, 1896, mosaic.

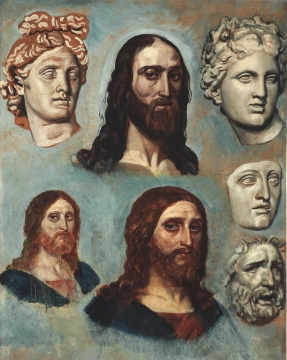
Alexandr Ivanov, study of Christ head
