= The Head of the Virgin in Three-Quarter View Facing Right =

Drawing on paper attributed to Leonardo da Vinci

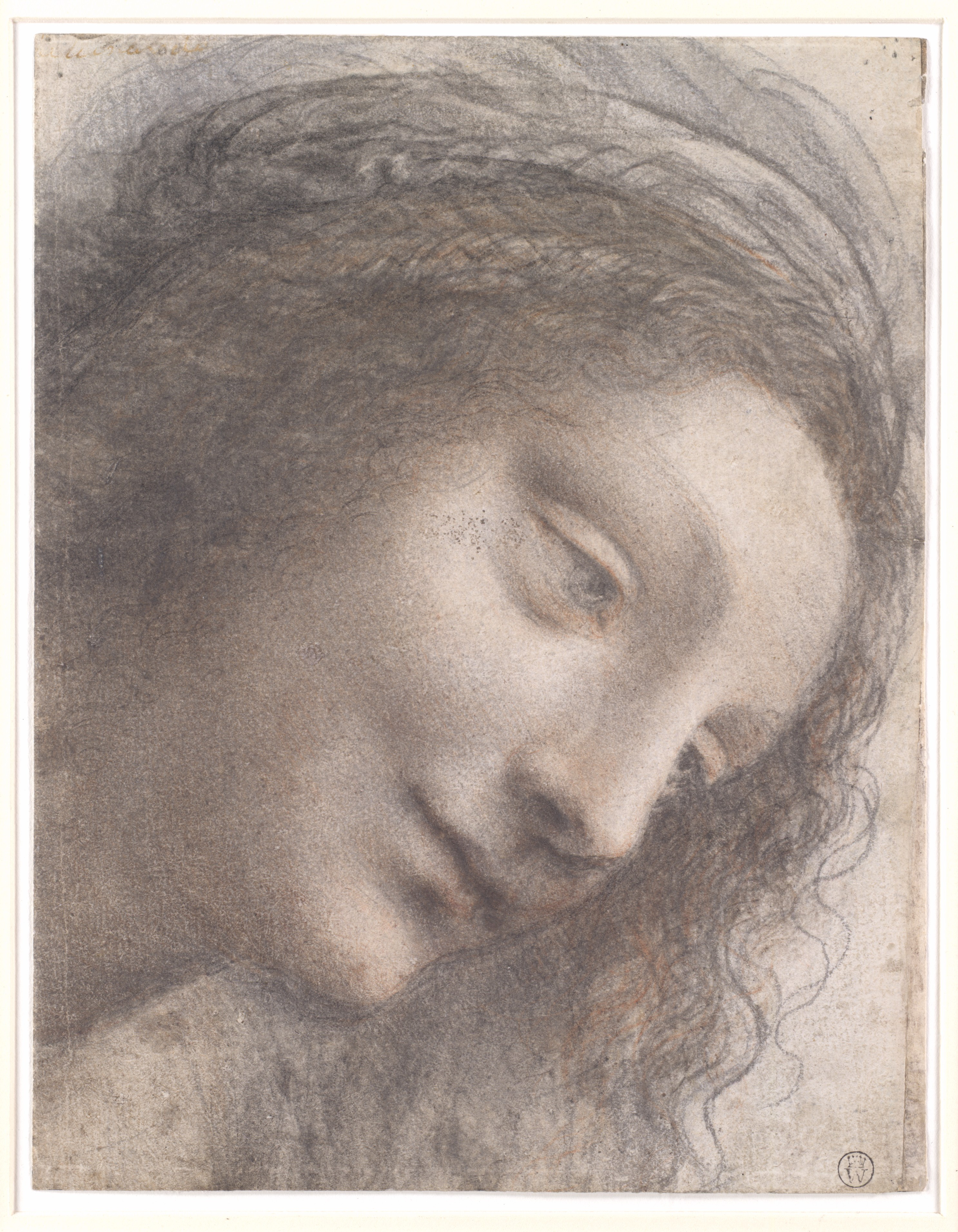
- Artist: Leonardo da Vinci
- Year: Between 1507 and 1513
- Medium: Pierre noir pencil, charcoal and red chalk, with some traces of white chalk on paper
- Subject: Study for The Virgin and Child with Saint Anne (Leonardo)
- Dimensions: 20.3 cm × 15.6 cm (8.0 in × 6.1 in)
- Location: Metropolitan Museum of Art, New York
- Accession: 51.90

The Head of the Virgin in Three-Quarter View Facing Right is a drawing on paper in Pierre noir pencil and red chalk, attributed to the Florentine painter Leonardo da Vinci and kept at the Metropolitan Museum of Art in New York.

This drawing, whose dimensions have been reduced by the removal of certain existing parts at the time of its creation, is a portrait of a woman's head. It is a preparatory study for the head of the Virgin Mary in the painting The Virgin and Child with Saint Anne in the Musée du Louvre.

Probably executed between 1507 and 1513, it belongs to a series of studies largely dating from the beginning of the painting's creation in 1502–1503, each focusing on a particular detail. The braid motif is largely different, but can be found in the studio copies; researchers consider this work to be one of the arguments in favor of the theory that these copies are life-size prototypes of the painting in the Louvre.

All Leonardo da Vinci's skills as a draughtsman can be seen in this work, in particular his mastery of the use of graphic materials and the rendering of sfumato, resulting in a work of incomparable poetics and beauty.

== Description ==
The Head of the Virgin in Three-Quarter View Facing Right was made on a rectangular sheet of paper measuring 20.3 × 15.6 cm. It seems that several years after its creation, it was amputated by wide strips on all four sides, as evidenced by copies made by followers, such as the one preserved in the Albertina Museum in Vienna (dated between 1508 and 1513 and measuring 22.7 × 26 cm): it thus shows the woman's neck and hair, which are absent from the drawing as it can be seen today.

On a red chalk preparation, the drawing is executed in Pierre noir pencil, pastel and again in red chalk. There are a few traces of white chalk highlights. In addition, there are some remnants of framing contours in the upper right, made with a pen and ink, which are not from the master's hand. Finally, the top left-hand corner of the sheet bears an inscription that remains indecipherable to researchers.

The drawing is a portrait of a young woman, with only her head visible. Tilted downwards, her face is seen in a three-quarter view on her right side. Her hair forms two braids held in place by a veil at the top of her head, while a lock hangs over her left cheek.

== History ==
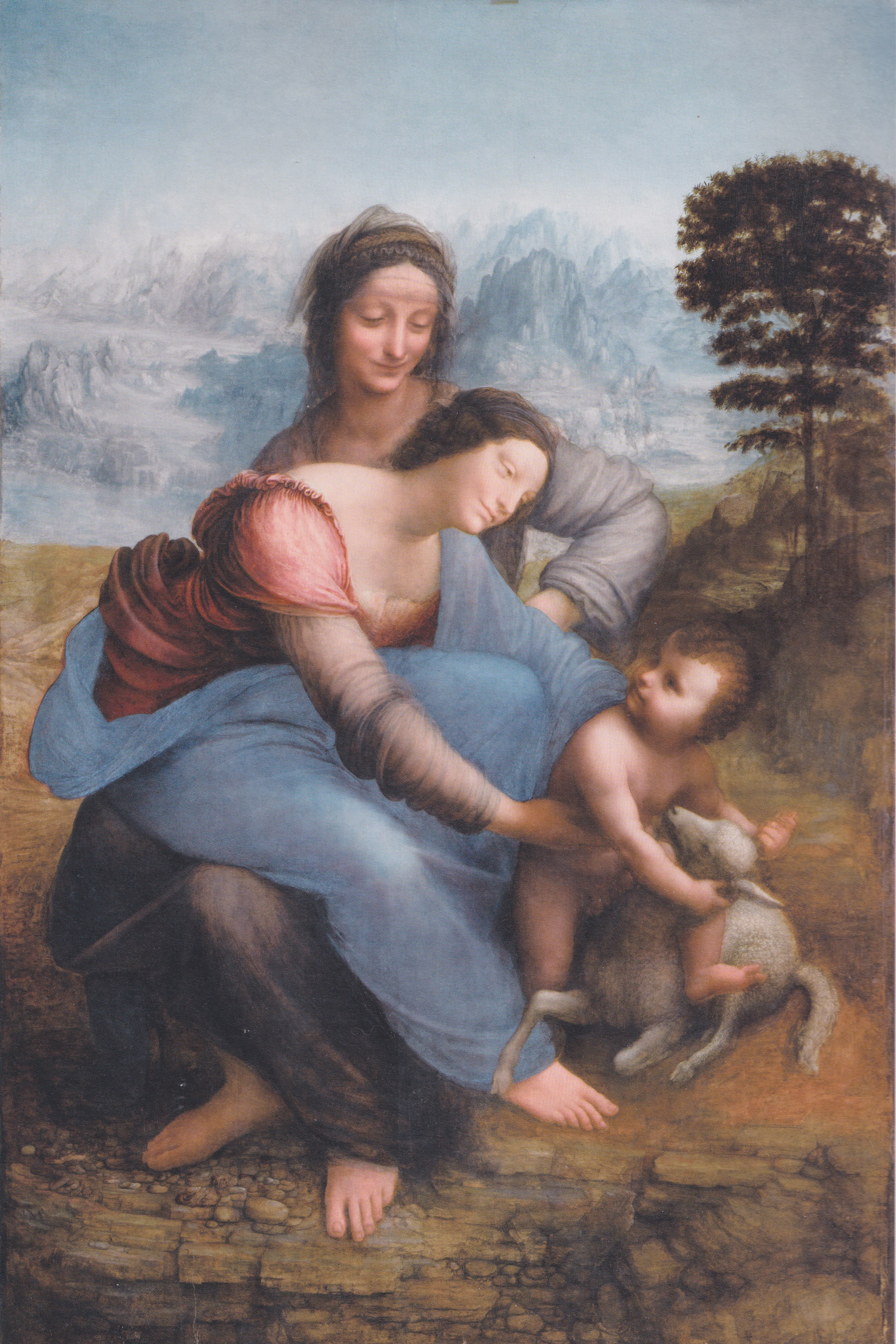
The drawing was created as part of The Virgin and Child with Saint Anne (1503–1519, Musée du Louvre, n° inv. 776).

Leonardo da Vinci was over fifty-five years old when he created the drawing of The Head of the Virgin in Three-Quarter View Facing Right in the years 1508–1510. In 1508, he began what is known as his "second Milanese period", which lasted until September 1513. He was already famous enough for powerful Italian and other European patrons to compete for his services as engineer and artist: first Isabella d'Este and Cesare Borgia at the very beginning of the century, then King Louis XII of France and his subordinates, such as his secretary of state Florimond Robertet and the governor he had sent to Milan, Charles d'Amboise. Vinci, who had fled from the French during the invasion of the Duchy of Milan in 1499, finally entered the service of King Louis XII in 1507.

Despite his self-declared distancing from painting, Leonardo nevertheless produced several works during this period: Salvator Mundi (after 1507), La Scapigliata (1508), Leda and the Swan (1508) and Bacchus (1510–1515). In addition, he had been working on a "Virgin and Child with Saint Anne" for several years, although it is not yet clear who commissioned it: the work now in the Louvre, begun in 1502–1503, was certainly still in draft form around 1507–1508, especially as the painter most likely abandoned it between 1504 and 1507.

Two types of study are directly related to this painting: those that enabled the creation of the painting board, and those that constituted "the final changes decided by the master" and are therefore the furthest removed in time from it. With its characteristic "highly complex and original technique", The Head of the Virgin in Three-Quarter View Facing Right belongs firmly in this second group. By this time, the painting was sufficiently advanced that it was no longer possible for Leonardo to modify the overall composition. His task was therefore to execute and perfect the details, including the hairstyles of the protagonists: he executed a dozen studies aimed at refining the initial drawing, including the study of The Head of the Virgin in Three-Quarter View Facing Right.

The creation of this study is relatively late compared to the start of the painting's production, which dates back to 1503. Vincent Delieuvin puts it at "circa 1507–1510", Sarah Taglialagamba and Carlo Pedretti at "circa 1510", while Carmen C. Bambach and the owner's museum website put it at "1510–13".

Other preparatory drawings for The Virgin and Child with Saint Anne and contemporary with The Head of the Virgin in Three-Quarter View Facing Right.
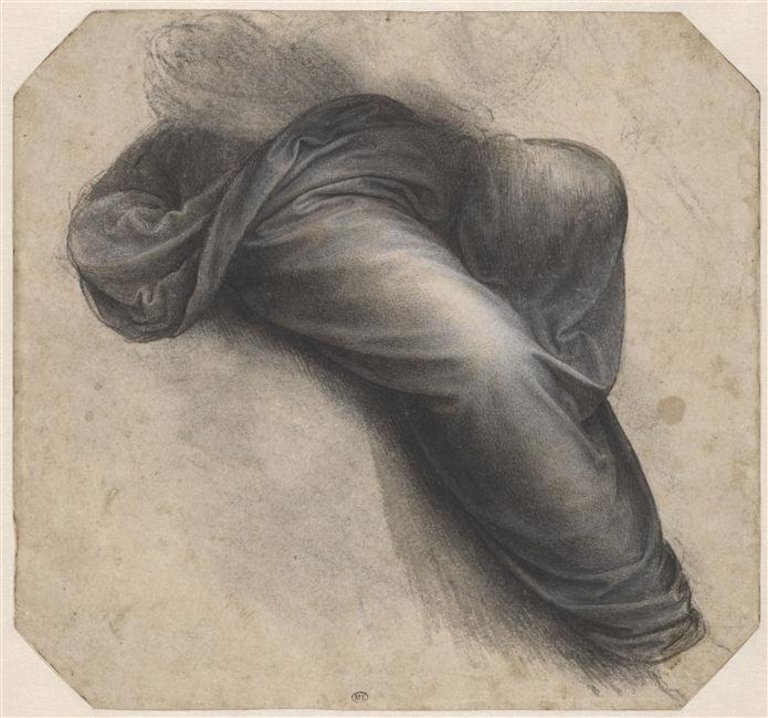
Drapery of the Virgin, c. 1507-1510, Paris, Department of Graphic Arts, Musée du Louvre, INV 2257.

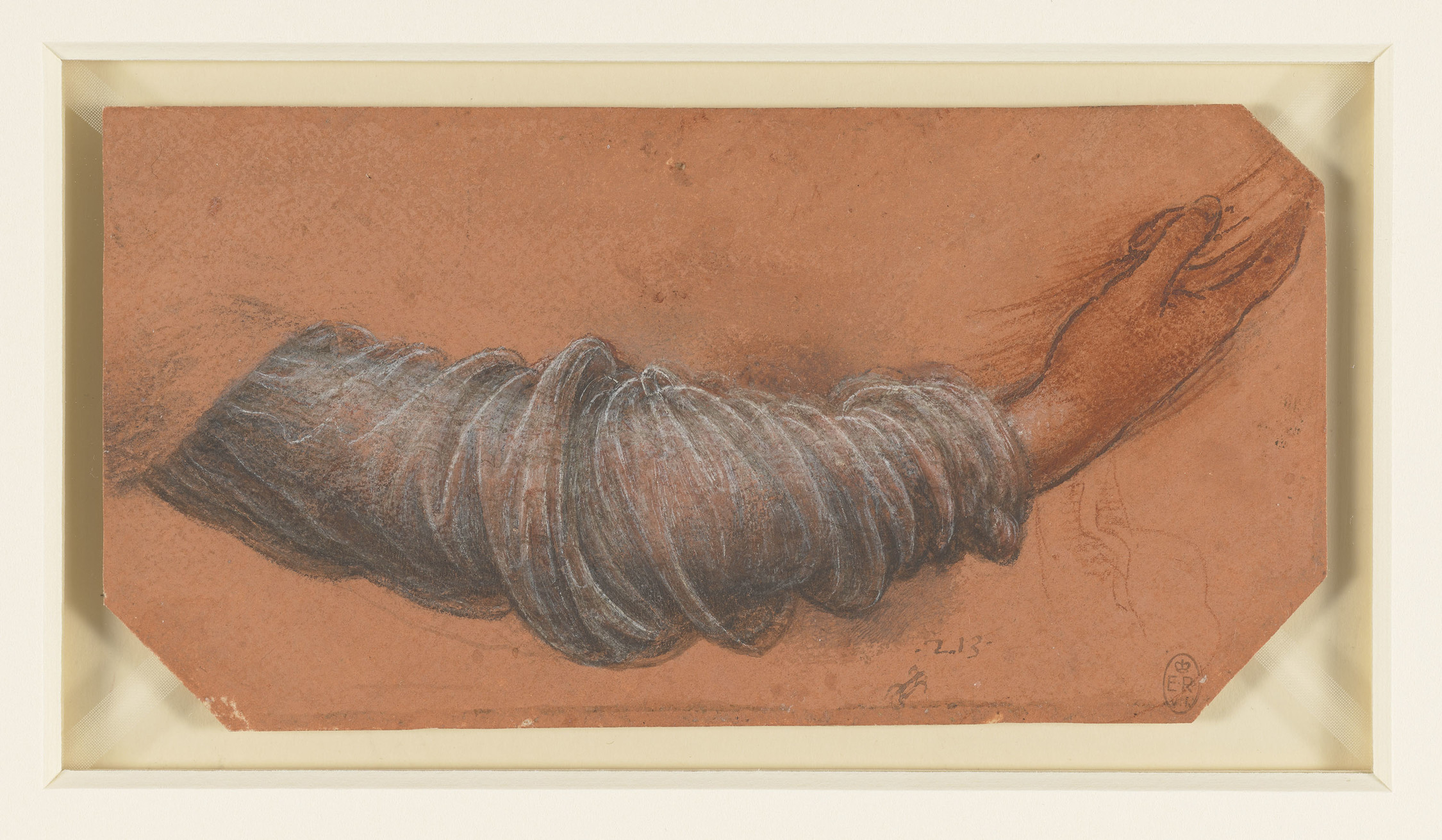
Arm of the virgin, c. 1510-1515, Windsor Castle, No. inventory. RCIN 912532.

=== Allocation ===
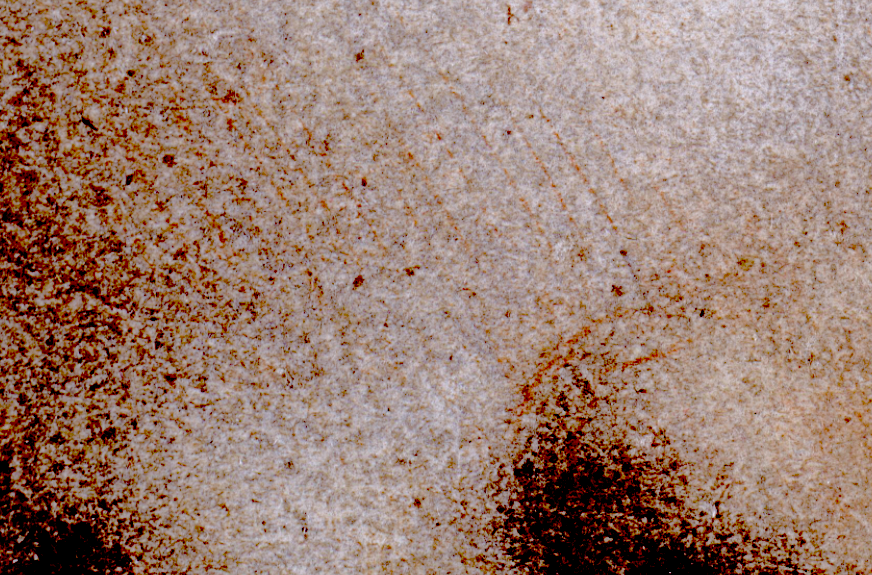
Detail of the right cheekbone (digitally reworked image): fine red chalk crosshatching typical of a left-handed person is visible.

Although the attribution of this work to Leonardo da Vinci had already been envisaged, it was hotly debated within the scientific community before the beginning of the 21st century. In particular, it was the work's overly perfect character that embarrassed many researchers, as Carmen C. Bambach put it. Bambach puts it this way: "its magical beauty makes it suspect". In 1966, German art historian Walter Vitzthum wrote that "the drawing is more reminiscent of Walter Pater's mind than of Leonardo's hand".

Nevertheless, new elements began to emerge at the beginning of the 21st century. By simply observing the work with the naked eye, Carmen C. In April 2002, Carmen C. Bambach discovered parallel crosshatching specific to a left-handed hand, particularly in the region of the right cheek, near the nose – a finding confirmed by photomicrographic analysis. Moreover, she considered that previous research had been unable to arrive at these observations because scientists had hitherto studied the work only through photographic snapshots, which therefore failed to capture the subtlety of the artist's work. Moreover, in 2005, a ".T." traced in gray-brown ink was discovered on the back of the sheet. This was the mark used on drawings and manuscripts by Leonardo da Vinci that belonged to the Melzi-Leoni collection. (Note: This is the collection of drawings inherited by Francesco Melzi on the painter's death and then, after a period of dispersal, largely brought together by Pompeo Leoni. (Galluzzi, Paolo (2019). "Les fabuleuses tribulations des manuscrits de Léonard". UNESCO (in French).))

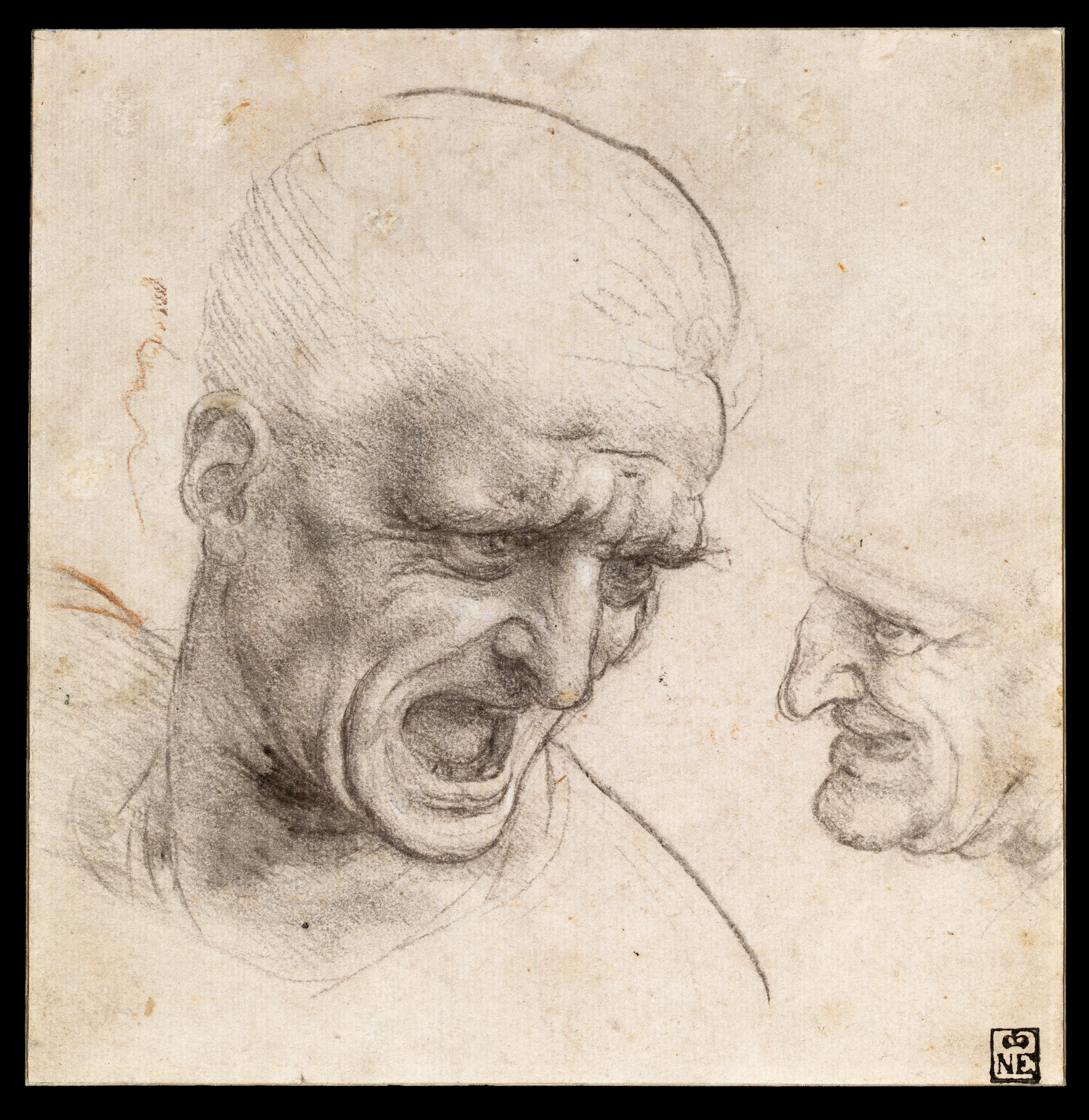
Leonardo da Vinci, Recto Study for the Head of a Soldier in the Battle of Anghiari, 1504–1505, Budapest, Museum of Fine Arts, no. inv. 1775.

This discovery therefore endorsed the hypothesis of attribution to Leonardo da Vinci. The stylistic and technical arguments put forward by the proponents of this hypothesis were further strengthened: firstly, the technique deployed here is similar to the Recto Study for the Head of a Soldier in the Battle of Anghiari, which is contemporary with the work (1504–1505) and has an identical preparation in red chalk. Furthermore, it appeared that the work represented a condensation of the painter's research into optical phenomena, resulting in a very homogeneous and fluid sfumato.

Since then, most art historians agreed that The Head of the Virgin in Three-Quarter View Facing Right was by Leonardo da Vinci: Carlo Pedretti, and following him, Sarah Taglialagamba, Carmen C. Bambach, Pietro C. Bambach, Pietro C. Marani and Vincent Delieuvin. Nevertheless, some still questioned its authenticity, such as Frank Zöllner, who expressed his skepticism by not mentioning it in his catalogs raisonnés of the painter's painted and graphic works. Last but not least, the work features a number of interventions that scientific analysis indicates are not autograph: pen-and-ink retouches, as well as slight restoration attempts that explain some of the darker passages in the right cheek, nose and lips.

=== Path of the artwork ===
It is only in recent times that it has been possible to trace the work's development after its creation. Listed in the drawing collection of Charles Greville (1763–1832), it was inherited by his nephew, the 4th Earl of Warwick George Guy Greville (1818–1893). It was subsequently sold at Christie's in London on May 20 and 21, 1896, and acquired by the chemist and art collector Ludwig Mond (1839–1909), also in London. It passed into the possession of Lady Gwen Melchett of Landford, then into her family, where it remained until its acquisition by the Metropolitan Museum of Art in New York in 1951 at the Sotheby's sale of May 23–24, 1951.

== A study for The Virgin and Child with Saint Anne ==
Being unanimously recognized as a study for the work mentioned above, this particular study focuses on the arrangement of the hairstyle: in fact, at this level, the drawing shows a superimposition of strokes, corresponding to so many propositions that make the drawing somewhat nebulous. However, this arrangement is not to be found in the cardboard used to create the painting in the Louvre, (Note: The master's original canvas, which served as the basis for the painting, is considered to have been lost, but a copy of this canvas, known as the "carton Resta-Esterazy" and bearing witness to its condition, remained visible until World War II.) nor in the painting itself, but in several studio versions, which thus acquired the status of life-size, painted prototypes of The Virgin and Child with Saint Anne: it would therefore seem that the study represented a reflection begun after the creation of the cardboard. It is situated during the production of the painting, when the artist – who could no longer modify the overall composition, which was then too far advanced – was in a phase of research, maturation and refinement of the details (draperies, hairstyles and gestures of the protagonists).

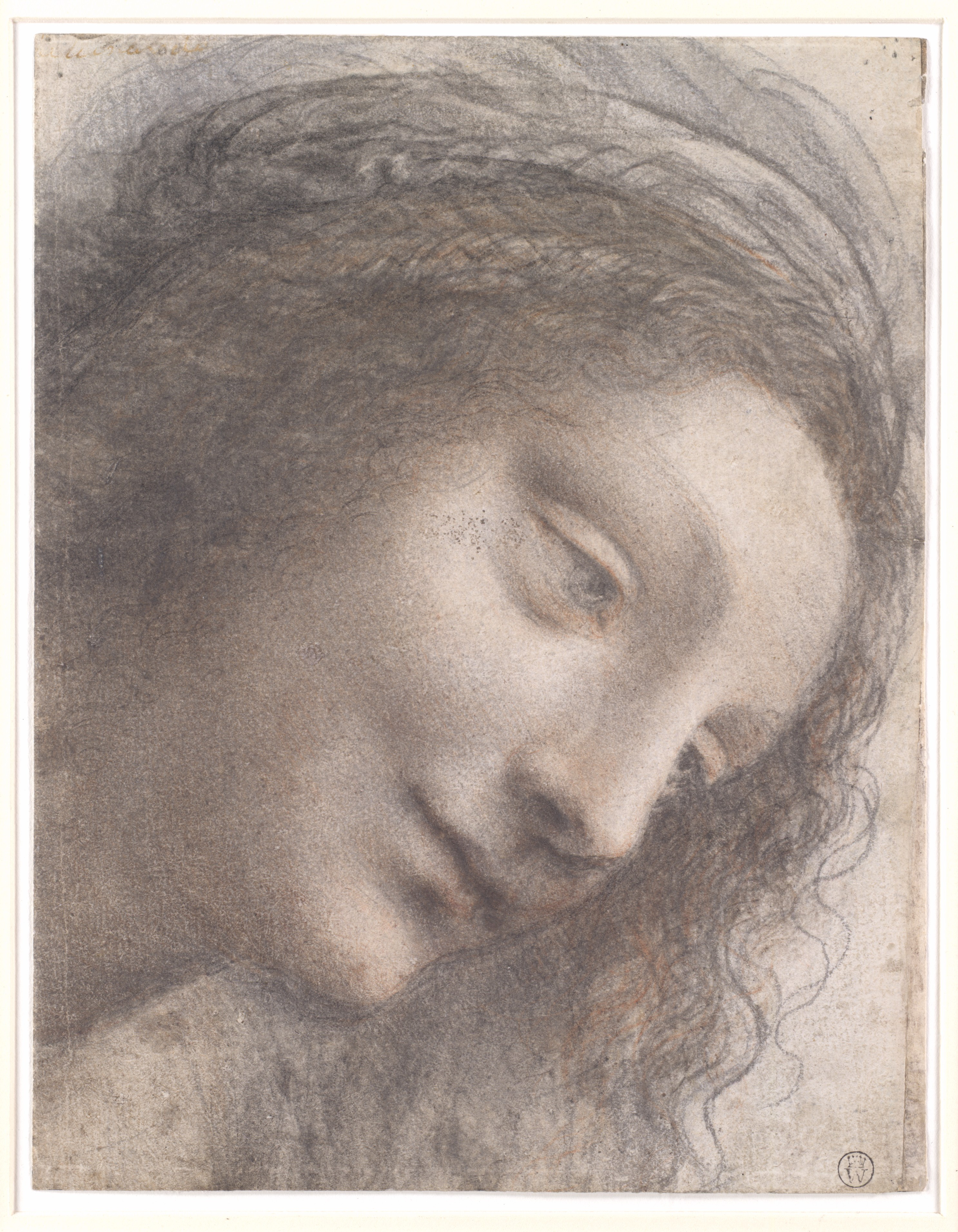
Study of The Head of the Virgin in Three-Quarter View Facing Right.

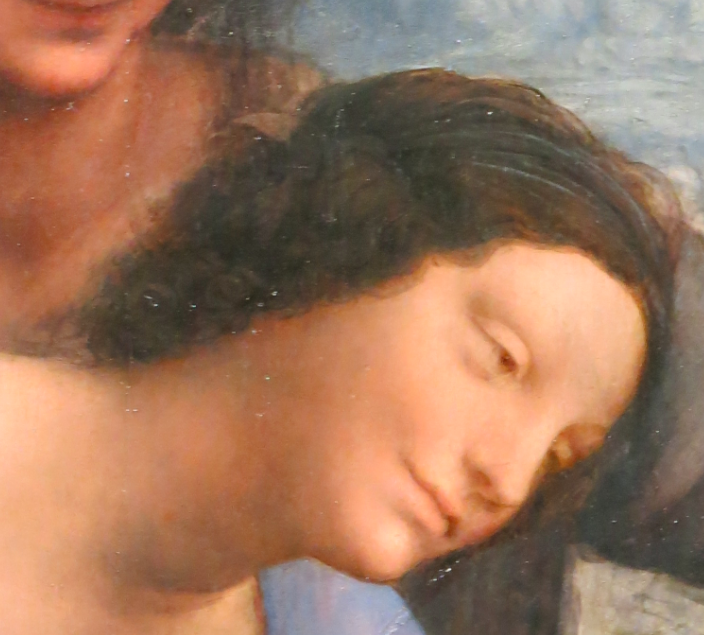
Head of the Virgin on The Virgin and Child with Saint Anne (detail, 1503-1519, Paris, Musée du Louvre, No. inv. 776).

== Analysis ==
=== An unrivalled technique ===
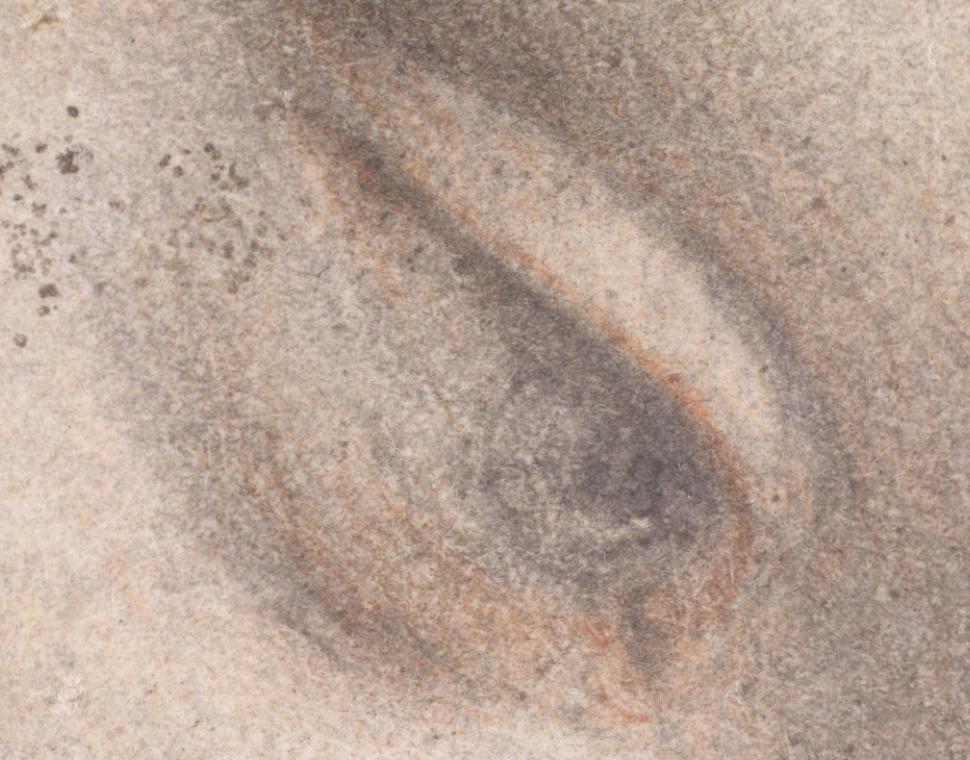
Eye detail: red chalk and pierre noire pencil blended harmoniously.

This particular study differs from the master's previous head studies "in that it is more painterly and more natural": the painter used an incomparable technique to achieve a remarkable poetics and beauty that his followers were unable to achieve.

=== Materials ===
To create a work with a very fine, soft play of light, Leonardo da Vinci first produced a preparation by blurring with red chalk. He then drew the contours of his face in gray-tone Pierre noir pencil, followed by red chalk strokes: this is particularly visible on the eyelid and tear duct. Darker pierre noire pencil was used to animate the veil and hair. The artist then created the shading "with an admirable fusion of faded pierre noire pencil and fine parallel red strokes, creating very subtle transitions of light". This complementarity of the two chalks is one of the first examples of the "twin chalk technique", which would be adopted by Mannerist painters two generations later. Finally, the work was enhanced by white highlights visible in the bright areas of the bridge of the nose and around the right eye. Conversely, the reflections in the eye were the result of a reserve of material on the paper.

=== The art of sfumato ===
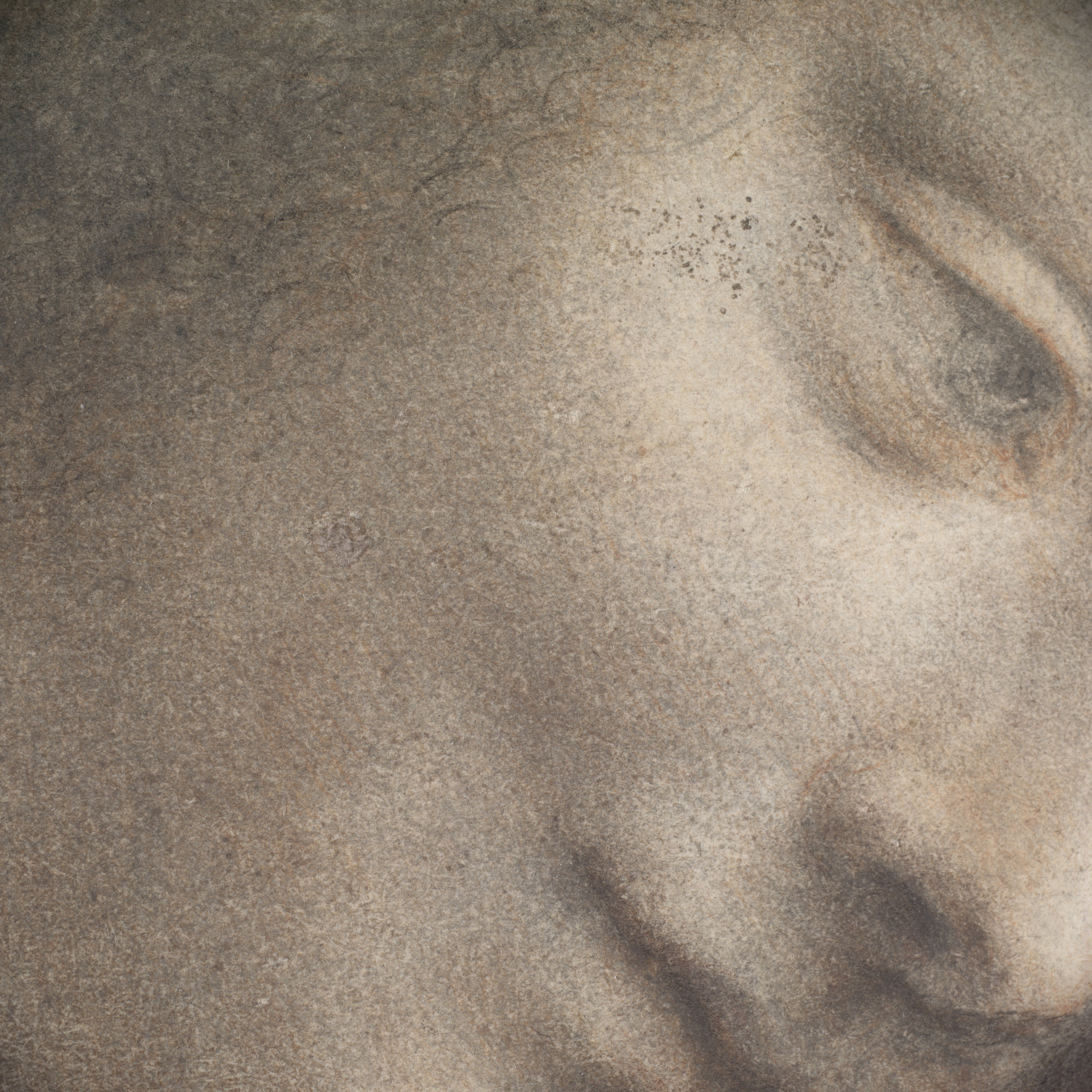
A close-up of the cheek reveals the sfumato effects (detail).

The artist's use of sfumato is characteristic of his work: it is a pictorial technique that he theorizes in his writings:

Make sure your light and shadow blend together like smoke, without lines or dashes.

This technique consisted in creating the illusion of atmospheric dissolution of relief forms through the use of hatching and the blurring of all the drawing's strokes, thus unifying and fluidifying the transitions of light and shadow.

Although the technique was also used on the hair, it is particularly evident on the face, where streaks and blurs are combined with red chalk and pierre noire pencil. Paradoxically, the sfumato is so well mastered that it constituted a hindrance to an analysis of the drawing's constituent features, and thus to a definite attribution to Leonardo da Vinci.

== Posterity ==
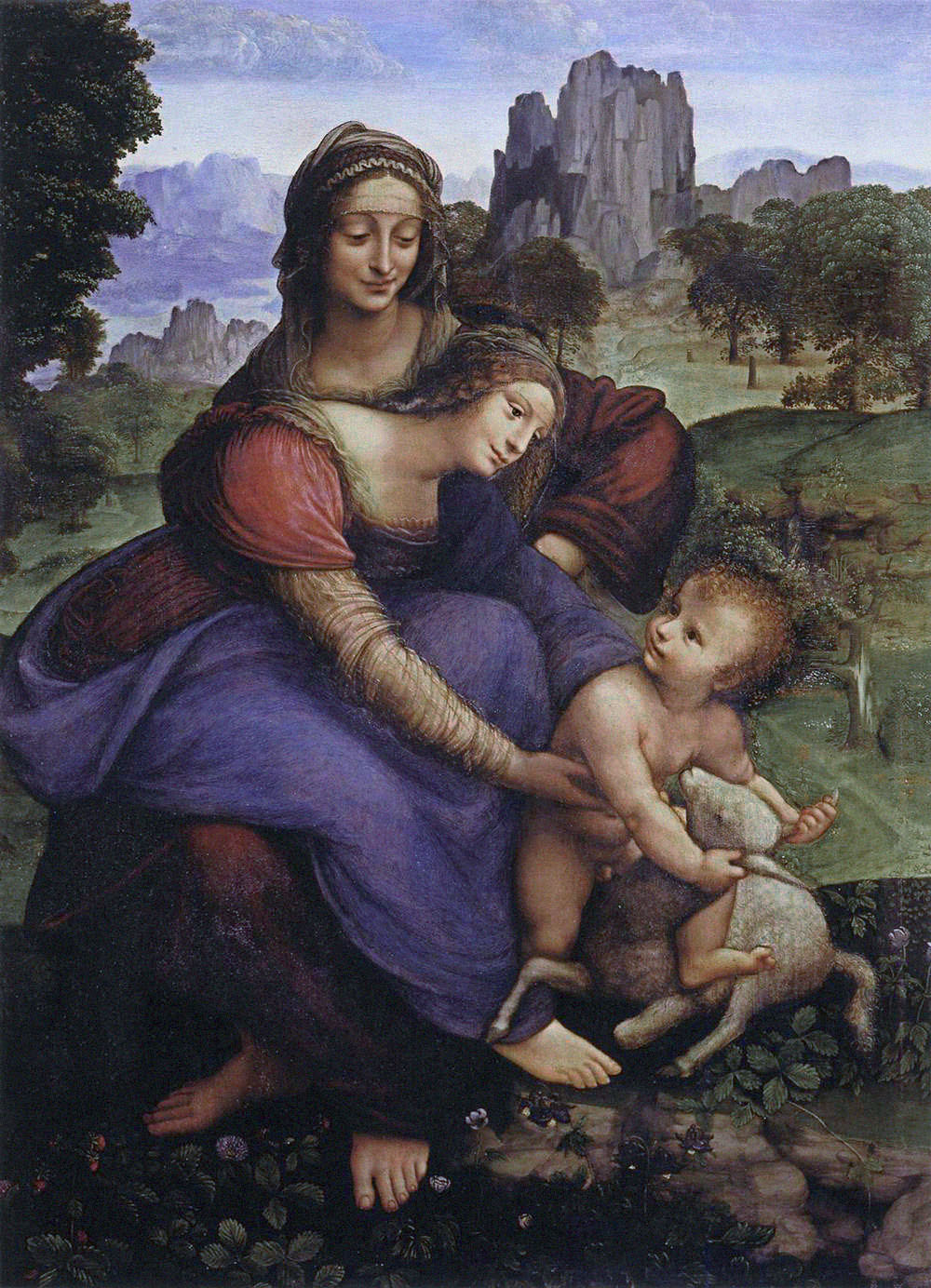
Follower of Leonardo da Vinci, The Virgin and Child with Saint Anne, circa 1514–1515, Florence, Uffizi Gallery, n°. inv. 1890, n. 737.

The drawing of The Head of the Virgin in Three-Quarter View Facing Right is a study for a painting. However, it is less in The Virgin and Child with Saint Anne than in studio copies of the master's composition that it is found, as indicated by the arrangement of the coiffure – i.e. the braid and veils covering it – absent from the painting preserved in the Louvre. This hairstyle can be found, for example, in a copy dated 1514–1515 and housed in the Uffizi Gallery in Florence.

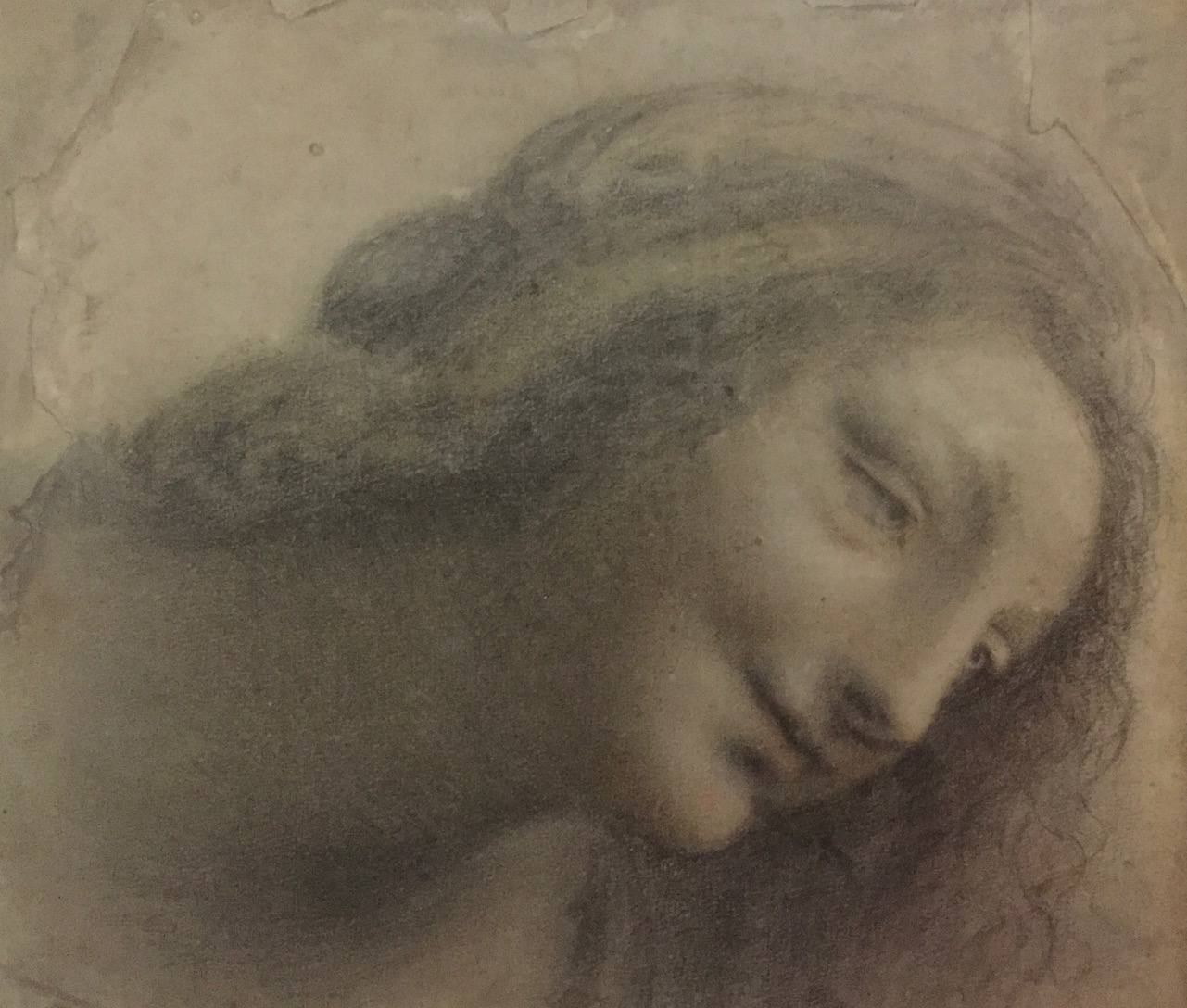
Follower of Leonardo da Vinci (could possibly be Salai), Head of the Virgin, between 1508 and 1513, Vienna (Austria), Albertina Museum, inv. n° 17613.

The drawing was the subject of copies by followers, including one in particular that was sometimes even attributed to the master, and in any case was contemporary with him. This drawing is now attributed to Salai with great reservations. Its interest lies in the fact that it has a larger format than the original, leading researchers to believe that it corresponded to the latter's original format.

Similarly, a copy also contemporary with the great painter is currently preserved in Milan, in the Ambrosian Library (under inv. f 263 inf. n. 76): it is not an exact copy, particularly in the arrangement of the braid, thus confirming the difficulty of reading the original drawing, the result of successive additions of strokes by Leonardo da Vinci. It is the red-on-red technique, in particular, that prompts researchers to attribute the drawing to the circle of the painter's immediate followers.

Reminiscence of Odilon Redon's drawing of The Head of the Virgin in Three-Quarter View Facing Right

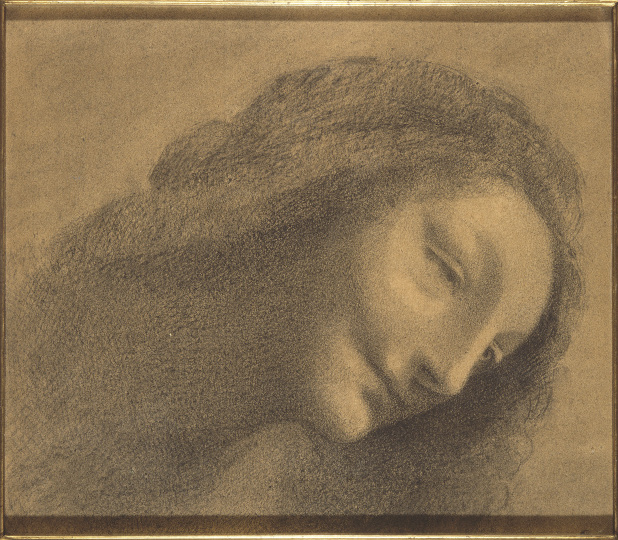
Odilon Redon, Head of the Virgin, 1867-1868, Paris, Musée d'Orsay, inv. no. RF 40891.

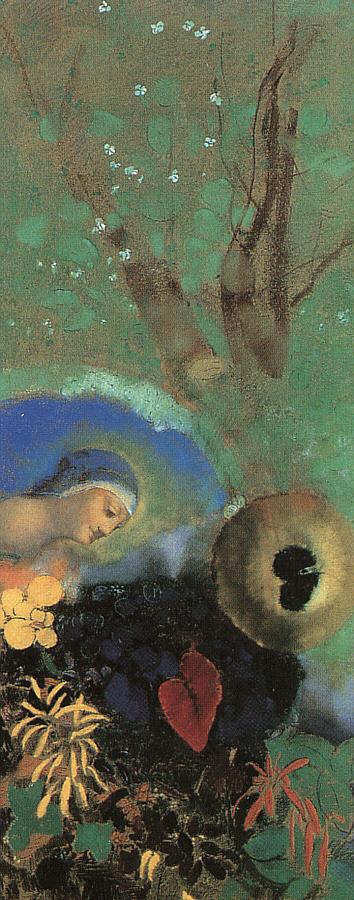
Odilon Redon, Homage à Léonard de Vinci, circa 1914, Amsterdam, Stedelijk Museum, inv. no. A-6439.

The drawing continued to inspire artists centuries later, such as Odilon Redon, an avowed admirer of the Florentine genius, who produced a copy around 1867–1868. But he did so from a photo of the drawing in the Albertina Museum – hence the corresponding format. A few years later, around 1914, he used the motif in his painting Hommage à Léonard de Vinci: "Here, the Virgin has been interpreted as a figure presiding over a rebirth of nature, a pantheism. Leonardo, who has always been a source of inspiration for Redon, is the artist who, having immersed himself in the mystery of nature, was able to reproduce its harmony".

== Bibliography ==
- Bambach, Carmen C.; Vecce, Carlo; Pedretti, Carlo; Viatte, Françoise; Cecchi, Alessandro; Kemp, Martin; Marani, Pietro C.; Farago, Claire; Forcione, Varena; et al. (Logan, Anne-Marie; Wolk-Simon, Linda; Manges, Alison & Stern, Rachel Stern) (2003). "Entries". Leonardo da Vinci, master draftsman. New York, New Haven: Metropolitan Museum of Art; Yale University Press. pp. 242–722. ISBN 978-1-5883-9034-9.
- Bambach, Carmen C.; Arasse, Daniel; Roy, Ashok; Saunders, David; Menu, Michel; Goavec, Rémy (2014). "On the role of scientific evidence in the study of Leonardo's drawings". In Menu, Michel (ed.). Leonardo da Vinci's Technical Practice: Paintings, Drawings, and Influence. Hermann. pp. 222–253. ISBN 978-2-7056-8455-6. OCLC 875181419.
- Bambach, Carmen C. (n.d.). "The Head of the Virgin in Three-Quarter View Facing Right". Metropolitan Museum of Art.
- Bramly, Serge (24 April 2019). "10 Comme une journée bien remplie". Léonard de Vinci: Une biographie. Essais et documents (in French). Paris: Jean-Claude Lattès. pp. 503–587. ISBN 978-2-7096-6323-6..
- Delieuvin, Vincent; Barbe, Françoise; Beuzelin, Cécile; Chui, Sue Ann (2012). "L'exécution picturale, de l'incessante quête de la perfection à l'inachèvement". La Sainte Anne: l'ultime chef-d'œuvre de léonard de Vinci (in French). Curie, Pierre; Eveno, Myriam; Foucart-Walter, Élisabeth; Frank, Louis; Frozinini, Cecilia; Gonzalez Mozo, Ana; Guillot de Suduiraut, Sophie; Gulli, Claudio; Mottin, Bruno; Pasquali, Cinzia; Phenix, Alan; Quattrini, Cristina; Ravaud, Élisabeth; Scailliérez, Cécile; Takahatake, Naoko. Paris: Louvre éditions. pp. 117–214. ISBN 978-2-35031-370-2. OCLC 796188596.
- musée du Louvre; Frank, Louis; Delieuvin, Vincent (2019). "167 Étude pour la Sainte Anne : le visage de la Vierge". Léonard de Vinci: 1452–1519 (Livret distribué au visiteur de l’exposition au musée du Louvre, du 24 octobre 2019 au 24 février 2020) (in French). Paris: Musée du Louvre. ISBN 978-2-85088-725-3.
- Delieuvin, Vincent; Frank, Louis; Bastian, Gilles; Bellec, Jean-Louis; Bellucci, Roberto; Calligaro, Thomas; Eveno, Myriam; Frosinini, Cecilia; Laval, Éric; et al. (Mottin, Bruno; Pichon, Laurent; Ravaud, Élisabeth; Bohl, Thomas; Couilleaux, Benjamin; Jatta, Barbara; Laugier, Ludovic; Marani, Pietro C.; Thiébaut, Dominique; Tullio Cataldo, Stefania; & Villela-Petit, Inès) (2019). "Mélancolie et joie". Léonard de Vinci (in French). Paris-Vanves: Louvre éditions – Hazan. pp. 258–289. ISBN 978-2-7541-1123-2.
- Pedretti, Carlo; Taglialagamba, Sara (October 11, 2017). Léonard de Vinci: L'art du dessin (in French). Paris: Citadelles et Mazenod. ISBN 978-2-85088-725-3.
