= Drapery Study for the Virgin =

Drawing by Leonardo da Vinci

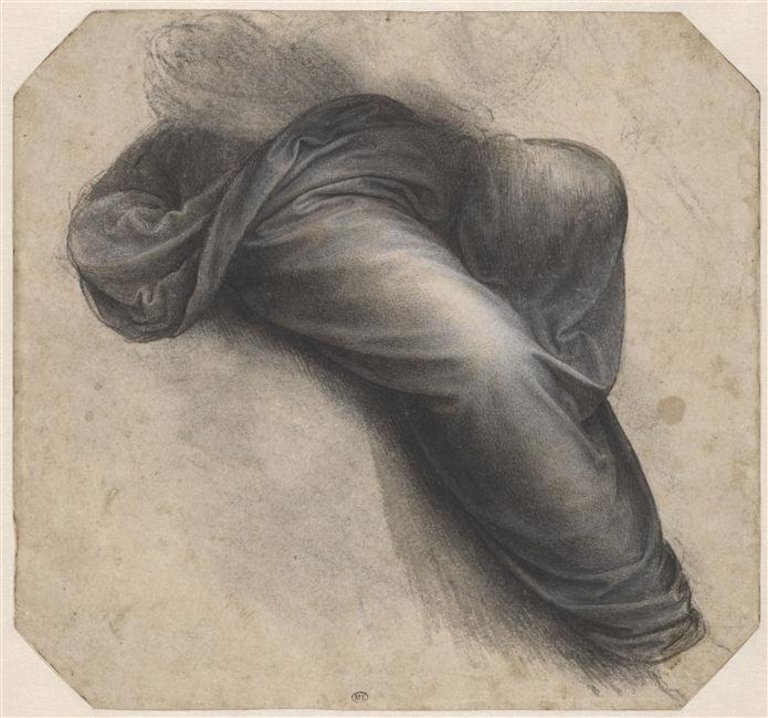
- Artist: Leonardo da Vinci
- Year: Between 1507 and 1517
- Medium: Black chalk, brush, washed with blank ink, with white heightening, on white paper
- Dimensions: 23 cm × 24.5 cm (9.1 in × 9.6 in)
- Location: Louvre, Paris
- Accession: INV. 2257

The Drapery Study for the Virgin is a drawing by Leonardo da Vinci in the Louvre. Executed in charcoal, Indian ink, and gray wash, with highlights of ceruse white on yellowed, black-tinted paper, it is a preparatory study for the drapery of the Virgin Mary's cloak in Leonardo's painting The Virgin and Child with Saint Anne, also in the Louvre.

This drawing is believed to have been executed between 1507 and 1510, with some scholars suggesting a later date of 1516–1517. It belongs to a series of preparatory studies probably made between 1502 and 1503, when the painting was conceived. Two of these studies focus on specific parts of the drapery: the cloth on the figure's right thigh and the fall of the fabric on the figure's hip. While the pose in this drawing differs slightly from that in the final work, its characteristics resemble those of studio copies, leading some researchers to believe that they were life-sized prototypes for the painting in the Louvre.

The drawing's finesse is achieved through a combination of diverse materials and intricate techniques, demonstrating Leonardo's evolving mastery.

== Description ==
The study is on a sheet of paper measuring 23.0 × 24.5 cm, prepared in black-tinted yellow. The piece is executed in black stone or charcoal, using a brush loaded with brown, gray, and white pigments, either Indian ink or white gouache highlights.

The composition features drapery enveloping the legs of a person seen from the side. The right leg is outstretched, and the left is bent, partly hidden behind. Furthermore, the lower torso, left arm, and right foot are sketched in an introductory manner yet are sufficiently visible to estimate the posture.

== History ==
=== Background ===
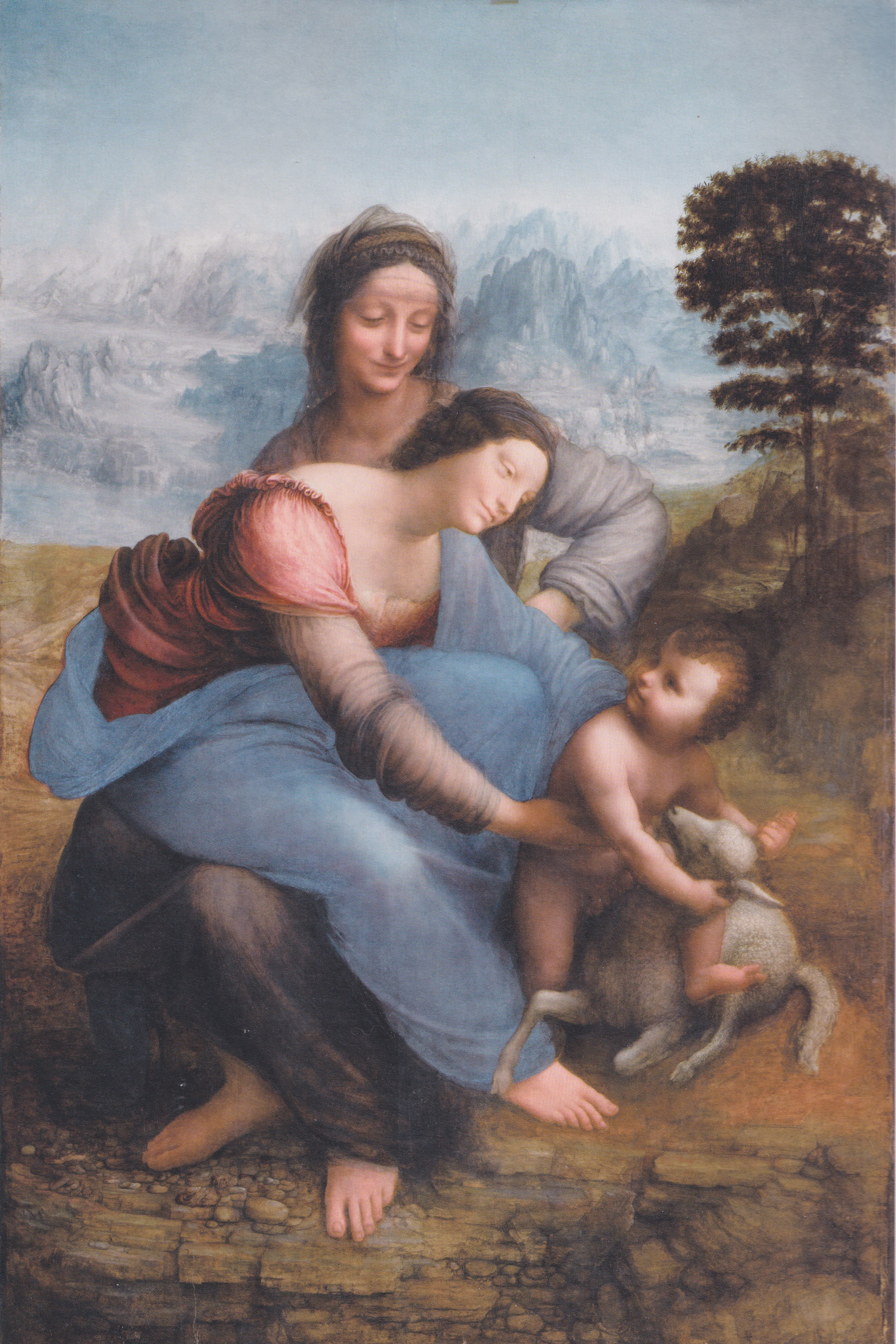
The drawing is a preparatory study for The Virgin and Child with Saint Anne (1503–1519, Louvre).

Leonardo da Vinci was between fifty-five and sixty-five years old when he executed the drawing, which was completed between 1507 and 1517 at most. In 1508, he began what is referred to as his "second Milanese period", which continued until September 1513. He was renowned not only in Italy but throughout Europe, and powerful patrons competed for his services as an engineer and artist, including the French king Louis XII and his subordinates—his secretary of state Florimond Robertet and the governor he had sent to Milan, Charles d'Amboise—Giuliano de' Medici, Duke of Nemours, in 1513 and Francis I in 1515.

Despite his self-declared lack of interest in painting, Leonardo was productive during this period, producing several works such as the Salvator Mundi (after 1507), La Scapigliata (1508), Leda and the Swan (1508), Saint John the Baptist as Bacchus (1510–1515), and Saint John the Baptist (between 1513 and 1516). Additionally, he had been working on a "Trinitarian Saint Anne" since the turn of the century. The circumstances surrounding its commissioning remain unclear. The painting currently on display at the Louvre, which was begun in 1502–1503, is likely still to have been in draft form around 1507–1508, as Leonardo in all probability abandoned it between 1504 and 1507.

Two types of study are directly related to this painting: those that enabled the creation of the cartoon and those constituting "the final changes decided by the master", which are, therefore, the furthest removed in time. With its characteristic experimental approach, this study belongs to the second group. By this point, the painting had reached a sufficiently advanced stage that Leonardo could not modify the overall composition. His objective was to execute and perfect the details, including the drapery of the figures and the rocks surrounding them. To this end, he produced a dozen studies, including this one, to refine the initial design of the cartoon.

Other preparatory drawings for The Virgin and Child with Saint Anne

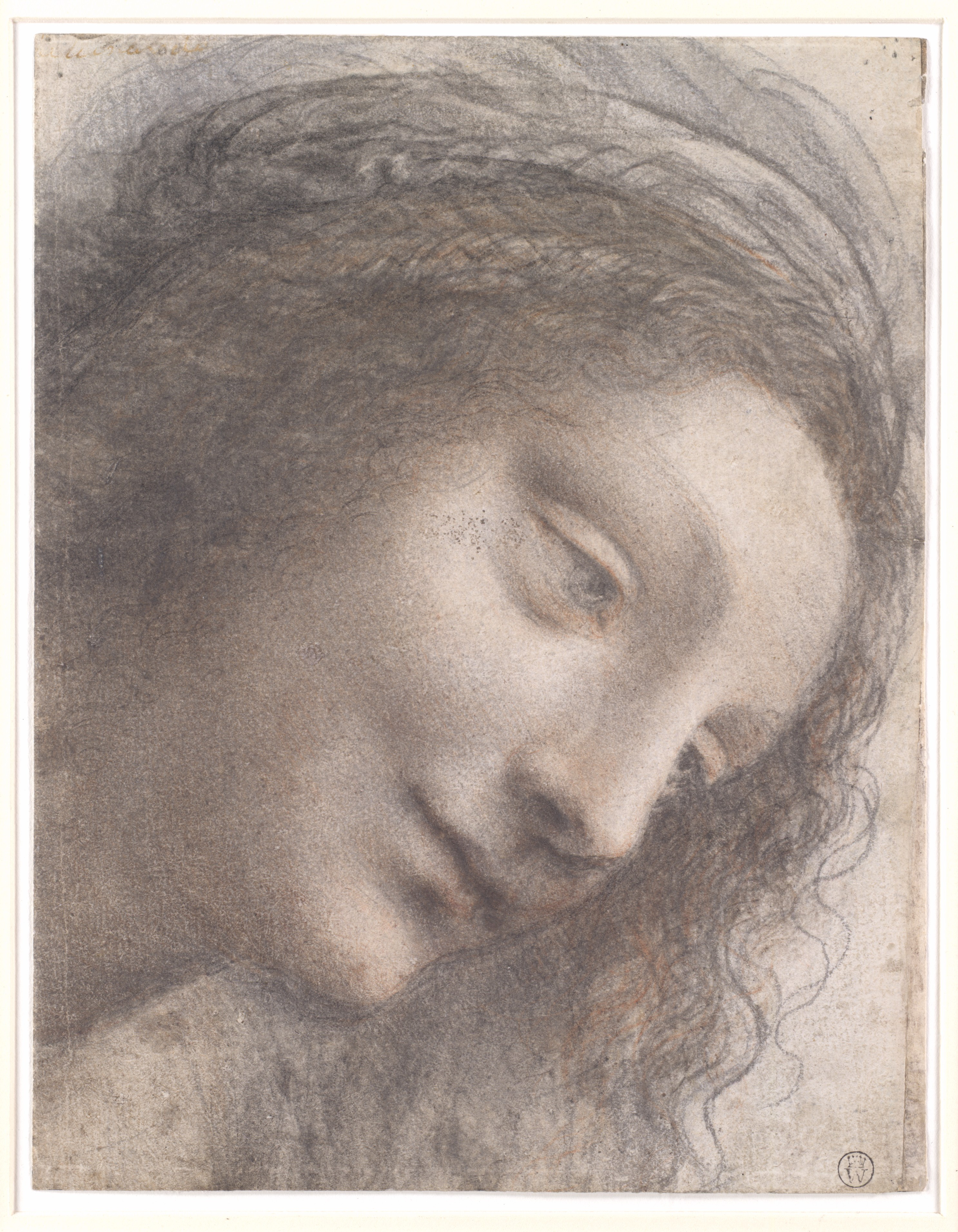
The Head of the Virgin in Three-Quarter View Facing Right between 1507 and 1513, New York, Metropolitan Museum of Art, inv. 1951 51.90, recto.

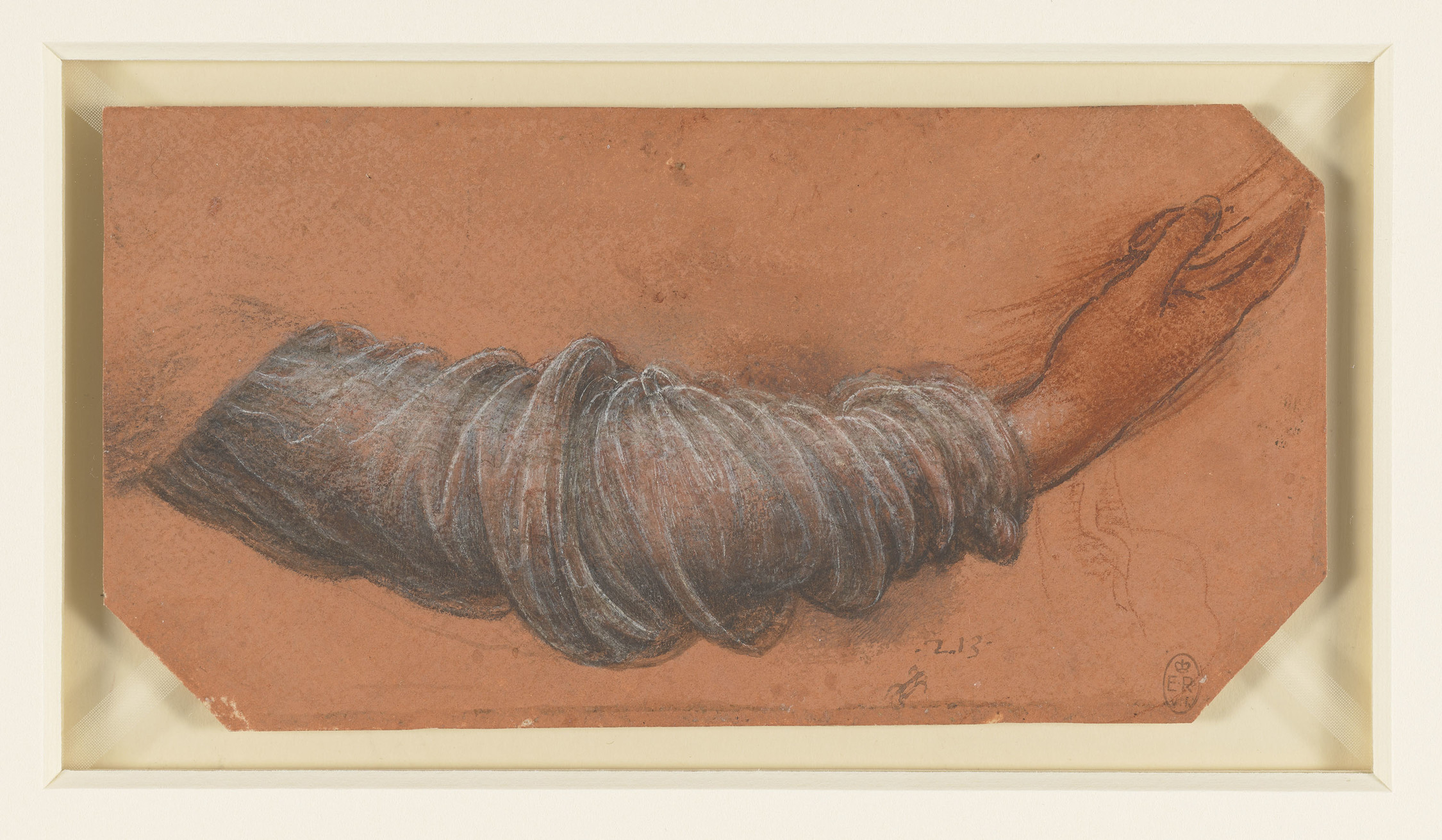
Study for the Virgin's Right Arm c. 1510–1515, Windsor Castle, RCIN 912532.

=== Dating ===
Two key factors influence the dating of this drawing. First, a date early in Leonardo's career is unlikely as his preferred media for drawing at that time were metalpoint and quill. Second, the drawing exhibits a technique characteristic of his later studies for the Virgin and Child with Saint Anne.

Despite these indications, the date of the drawing is uncertain, according to researchers. The Louvre's website and Vincent Delieuvin indicate that the earliest possible dating is c. 1507/1510. In a very close estimate, Kenneth Clark suggests c. 1508–1510 Françoise Viatte, in agreement with Carmen C. Bambach, has provided an intermediate estimate of 1510–1513. For their part, Carlo Pedretti and Sara Taglialagamba suggest c. 1516–1517, a very late date, close to the painter's death, because the work "manifests both a conceptual and visual departure from earlier works" and must therefore be pushed back into the painter's French period.

Given the uncertainty surrounding the painting's date, some researchers have proposed a comprehensive dating for the study, such as Peter Hohenstatt who dates it at c. 1503–1517, or a more open-ended approach, as with Frank Zöllner and Johannes Nathan's proposed dating of "c. 1501 or 1510/11 (?)".

=== Attribution ===
The Drapery Study for the Virgin is unquestionably attributed to Leonardo da Vinci. Researchers have identified the presence of the typical left-handed cross-hatching in white gouache, which marks illuminated areas. It is possible, however, that the work may have been subsequently reworked by another hand, potentially someone from Leonardo's workshop.

=== Provenance ===
The drawing's subsequent history has only recently been documented. It was in the possession of the French art collector Jean-Baptiste Wicar (1762–1834). In 1823, the work was sold to the art dealer Samuel Woodburn (1783–1853), from whom it was purchased by Sir Thomas Lawrence (1769–1830), George IV's court portraitist. It was subsequently acquired for the art collection of William II of the Netherlands. However, as his estate was insolvent, it was dispersed in 1849 on the King's death by his brother, Frederick of Orange-Nassau. Under the catalogue number 182, the work was included in the sale of William II's collection in The Hague on 12 August 1850. The study was finally acquired by the Louvre in October 1851, along with 22 other drawings by Italian Renaissance masters, after briefly passing once more through the hands of Samuel Woodburn, the same individual who had previously sold it 27 years earlier. It has remained in the Louvre's collection since that time.

== A study for The Virgin and Child with Saint Anne ==
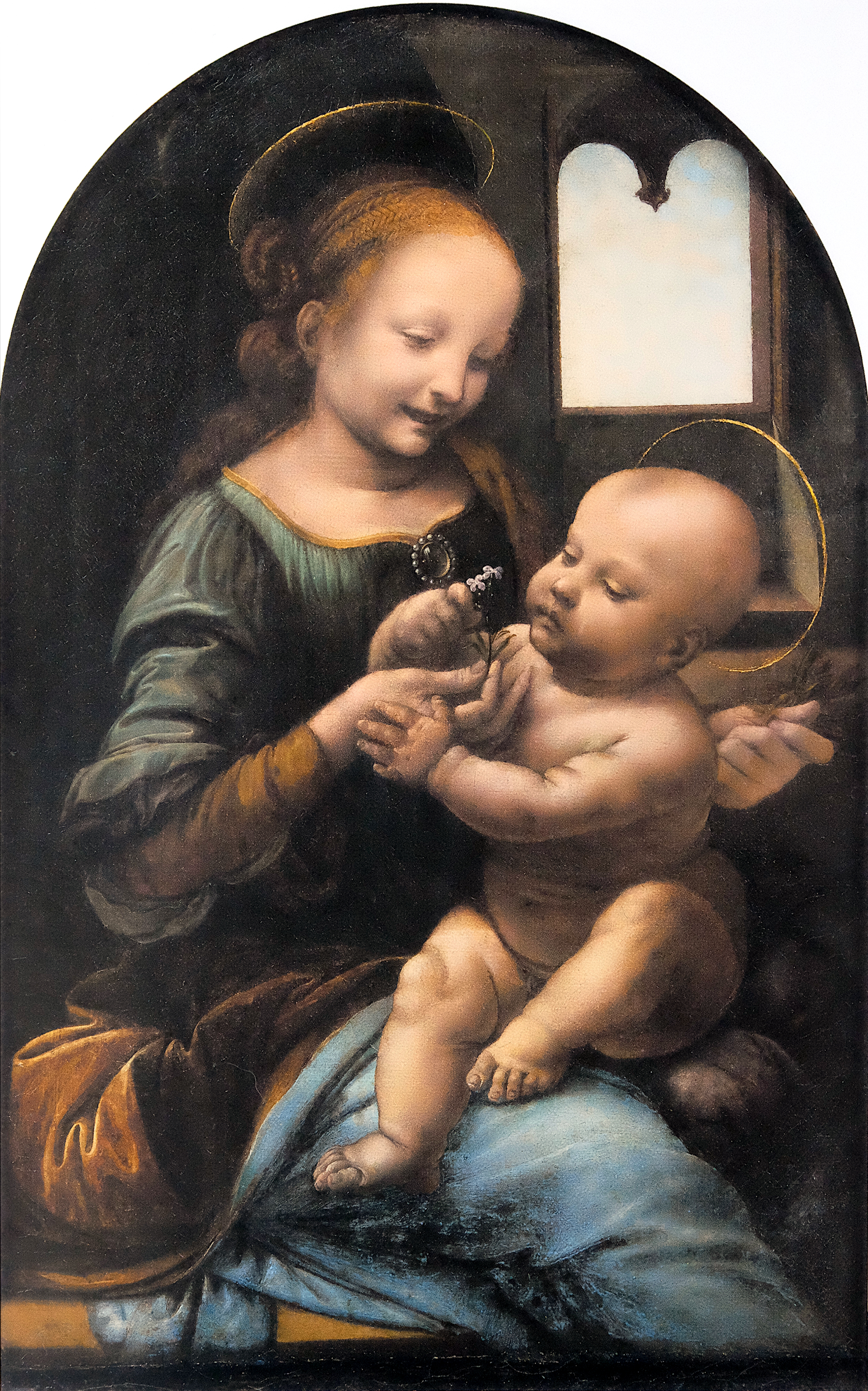
Leonardo da Vinci, Benois Madonna, between 1478 and 1482, Hermitage Museum, Saint Petersburg

The drawing is widely acknowledged as a preliminary study for the drapery of the Virgin's cloak in the painting The Virgin and Child with Saint Anne in the Louvre, albeit from a slightly different angle.

It is possible that this drawing was intended as a study for the drapery of the Virgin's dress in Leonardo's Benois Madonna, dated between 1478 and 1482, due to similarities with the studies in that painting. However, this hypothesis is no longer valid, particularly as the style of the drawing and the nature of the support do not match this very early dating. This resemblance is more likely to be attributed to the formal research carried out by the master during his career, which can be seen in The Annunciation (1472–1475) and The Virgin of the Rocks (London version, dated between 1491 and 1499, then between 1506 and 1508). Furthermore, several arguments support the conclusion that the painting in the Louvre is the source. The striking visual similarity between the two draperies—the position of the legs, the bust, and the left arm—is noteworthy. Secondly, the studio assistants used the sheet in their studies for copies of the work. Thirdly, the materials used are similar to those in other studies relating to the painting.

This drawing belongs to a series of studies focusing on the drapery of the Virgin's garment, reflecting the artist's meticulous attention to detail. The primary objective of these studies is to detail the effect of the drapery on the figure's leg and to resolve the problem of folding the edge of the cloak over the figure's hip. The series exhibits a unified approach, employing a complex technique that blends various materials to achieve a lifelike quality. This technique probably served as a way to visualize the final painted effect more efficiently.

Two studies by Leonardo da Vinci directly related to the Drapery Study for the Virgin

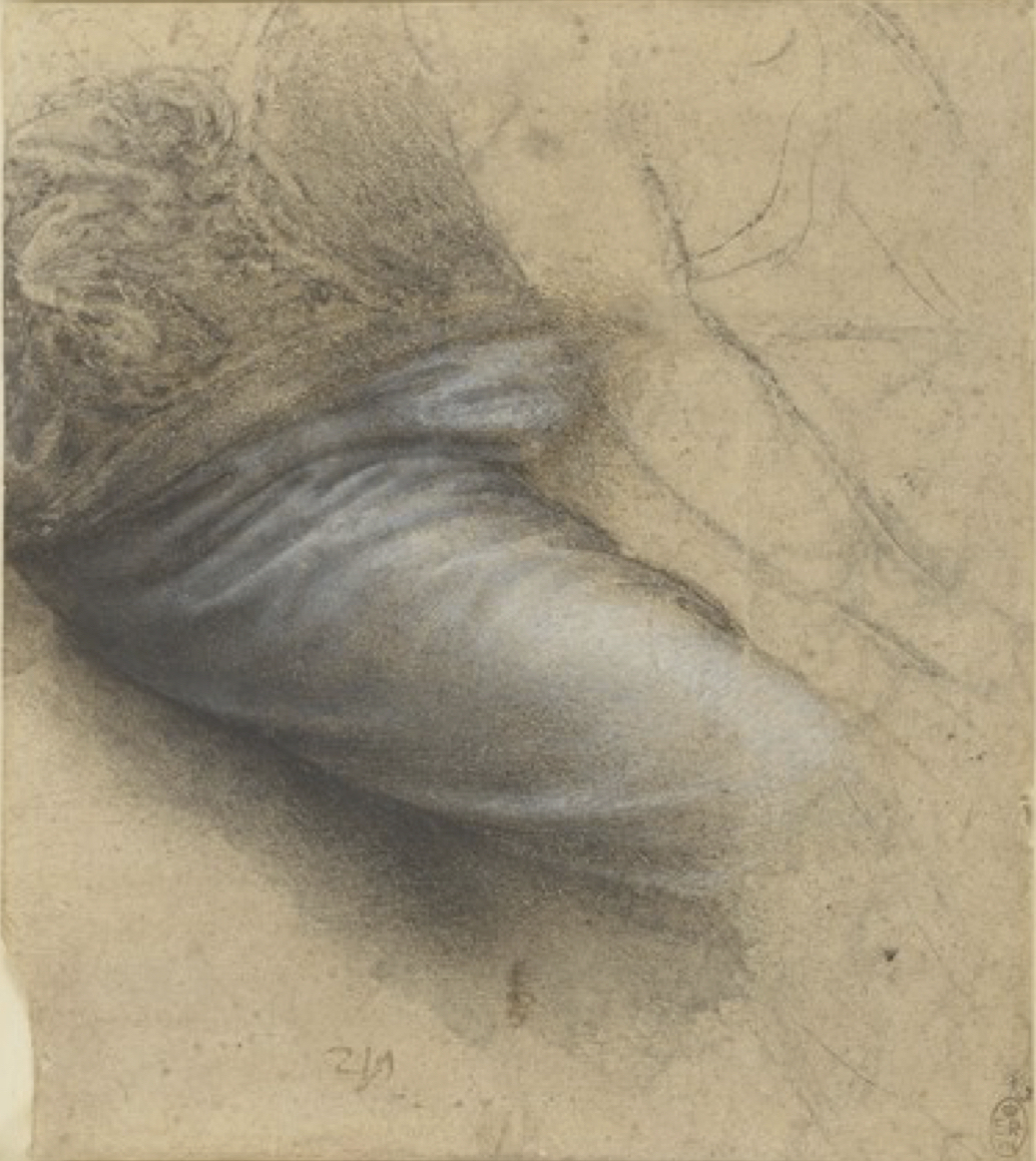
Study for the Virgin's Cloak, between 1507 and 1517, Windsor Castle, RL 12530.

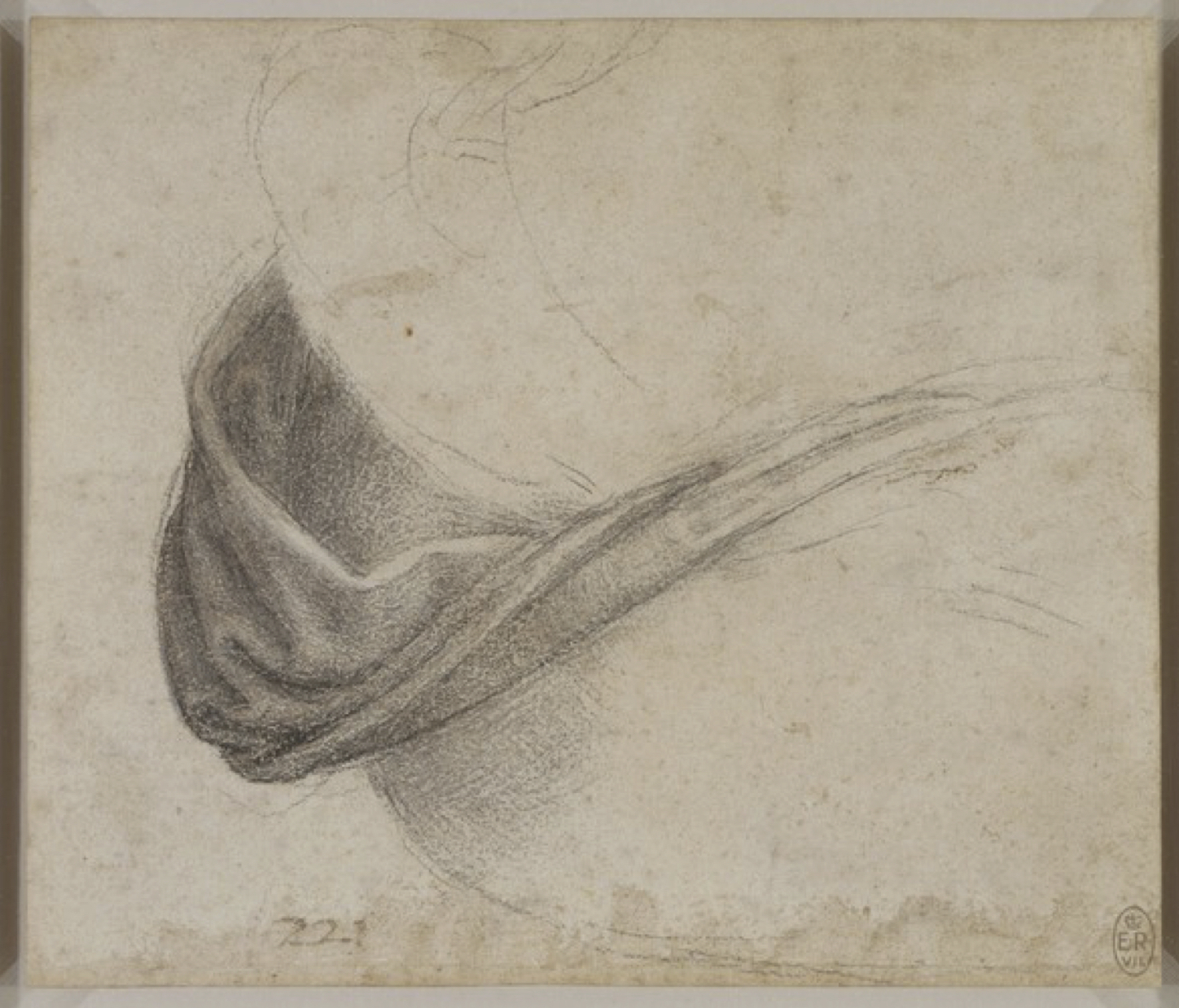
Study for the Virgin's Cloak, c. 1510–1515, Windsor Castle, RL 12529.

Another related drawing from this period is housed at Windsor Castle under inventory number RL 12530. Its dating is debated, with scholars suggesting either 1507–1513 or 1515–1517. Like the study in the Louvre, it is only genuinely finished in the section depicting the figure's right thigh. The remainder of the body, including the chest, arms, and torso, is only sketched rudimentarily. The painting's interest lies in the precise play of light, which complements the drapery study in the Louvre. It should be noted, however, that the forms depicted in the drawing do not correspond to those in the painting. For those who date the painting to c. 1507, this could be considered a preliminary phase of reflection leading up to the creation of the Drapery Study for the Virgin.

Another drapery study is preserved at Windsor under the reference number RL12529 and dated c. 1510–1515. The focus is on creating a fabric drapery that falls back onto the figure's hip. However, if the composition of this drawing, which differs from that in the study in the Louvre, can be identified as it appears in the painting, it is not without considerable hesitation. Scientific analysis of the painting using infrared reflectography has yielded two pieces of information. First, the painter traced the sketch of the drapery study in the Louvre in the red lacquer layer. Second, when he applied the blue layer, he reduced this motif to adopt a shape identical to the Windsor drapery study (no. RL12529), a shape that would not evolve after that. A reputedly faithful copy of the cartoon (Note: When Leonardo da Vinci created his cartoon for the painting in the Louvre, a member of his workshop created another, a copy, the Resta-Esterhazy cartoon. This cartoon is of interest because it testifies to the transition between study and final realization. The cartoon was kept in Budapest until it was destroyed in the middle of the Second World War. Period photographs remain as evidence of its existence.) provides evidence of the painter's indecision regarding this motif. The image shows a large swath of fabric in the style of the drapery study in the Louvre.

Comparison of the cartoon, the study, and the realization of the motif within the painting.<ref group="Notes">Given that the original cartoon has been missing since at least the 17th century, the Resta-Esterhazy cartoon, which is reputed to be faithful to the original, is considered here.</ref>

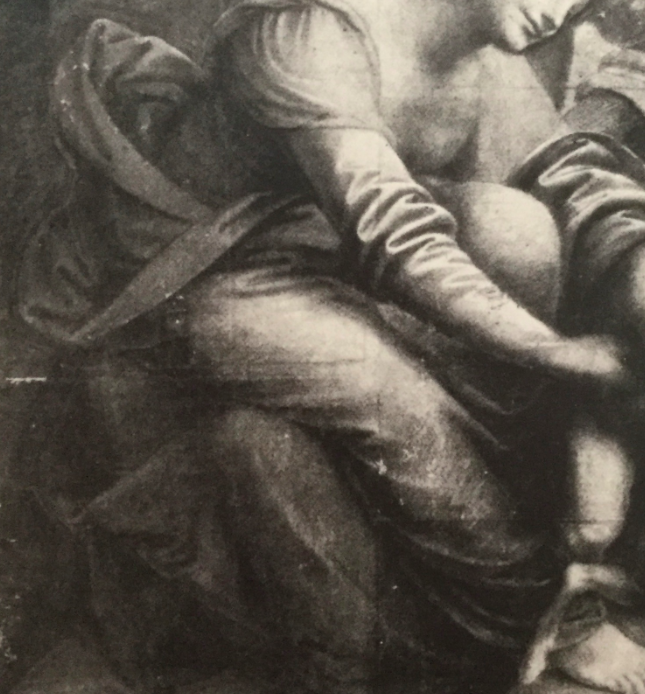
The Virgin's cloak in the Resta-Esterhazy cartoon (c. 1503–1506, no longer extant).

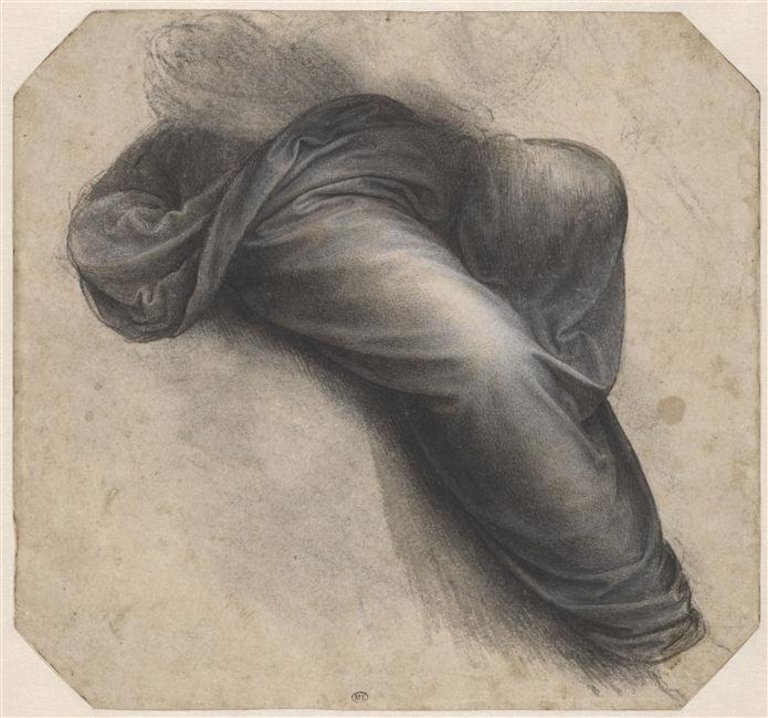
Drapery Study for the Virgin (between 1507 and 1517).

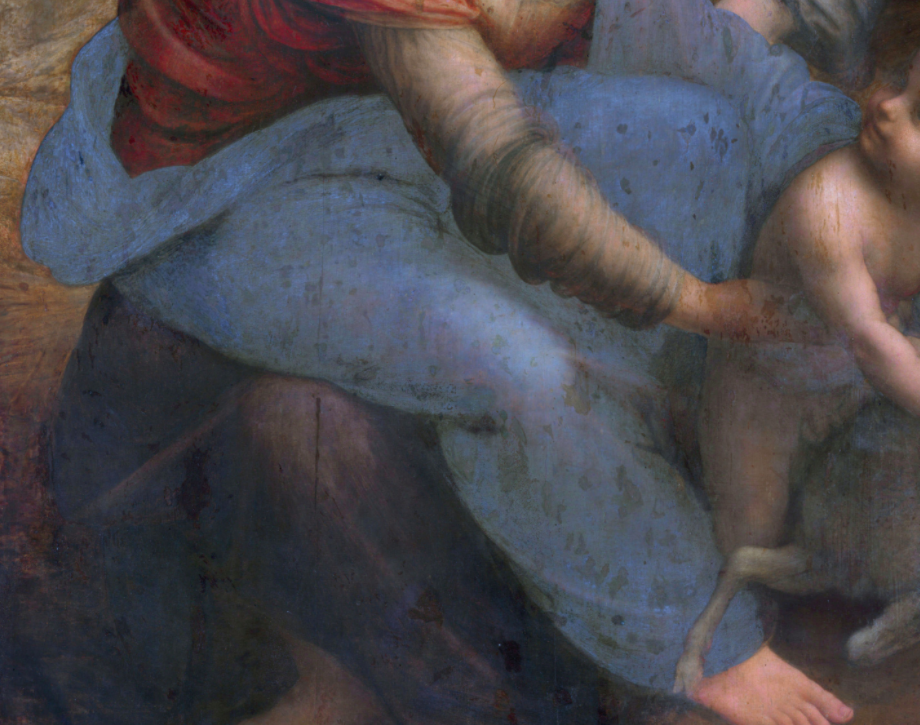
Drapery of the Virgin's cloak with Saint Anne's breast, The Virgin and Child with Saint Anne.

== Analysis ==
=== A masterpiece of technical finesse ===
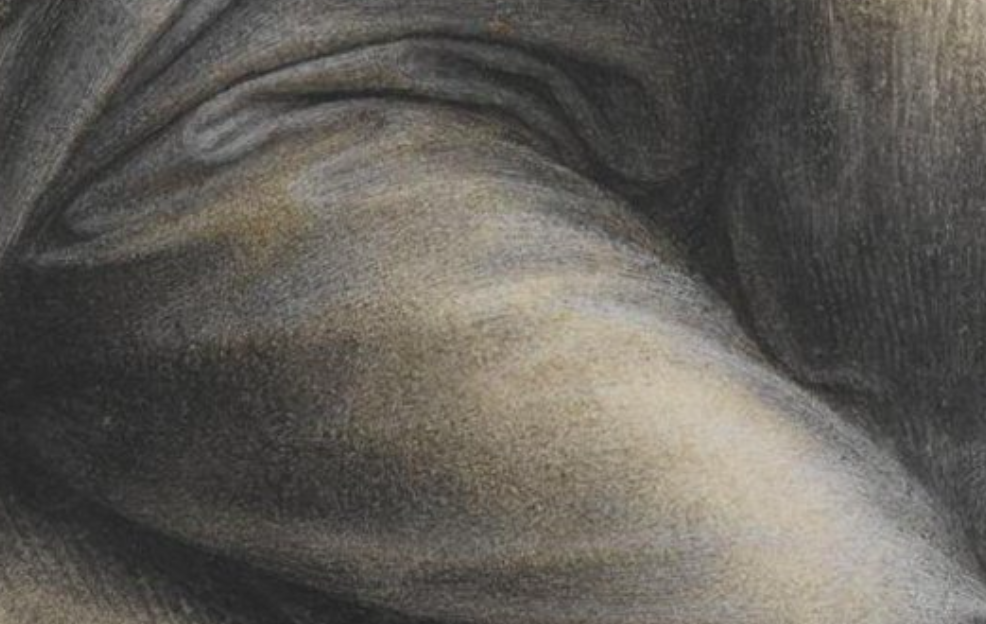
A close-up of the right thigh reveals the variety of materials used and the complexity of the technique deployed.

The Drapery Study for the Virgin was executed in a similar style to the later studies for the painting. The artist's skill and technical mastery are evident in the variety of materials used, the richness and complexity of the technique, and the meticulousness with which the painter implements them, resulting in a highly pictorial piece. The drapery study employs a sfumato technique, blurs the contours, and depicts the reliefs with superb technical mastery. It alternates white gouache, chalk, brown ink, washing, and hatching. The objective is to replicate the desired effect as closely as possible in the painting.

To achieve this, the painter created a dark undercoat and then a drawing, outlining it in black stone. The torso and arm sections will remain as is. To begin modeling the shadows, he applied a blurred undercoat. Once this was completed, he resumed his brushwork, using blue and brownish washes for the shadows and heightened them with white gouache, drawing vertical or curved hatchings for the lit areas.

The work has been described as "infinitely meticulous", with a "particular finesse" due to its "meticulous application of pigments" and "diversity of technical inventions". In the 19th century, researchers such as Eugène Müntz and Frédéric Reiset determined that the finish was so perfect that they believed the drawing had recently been retouched.

=== The art of drapery ===
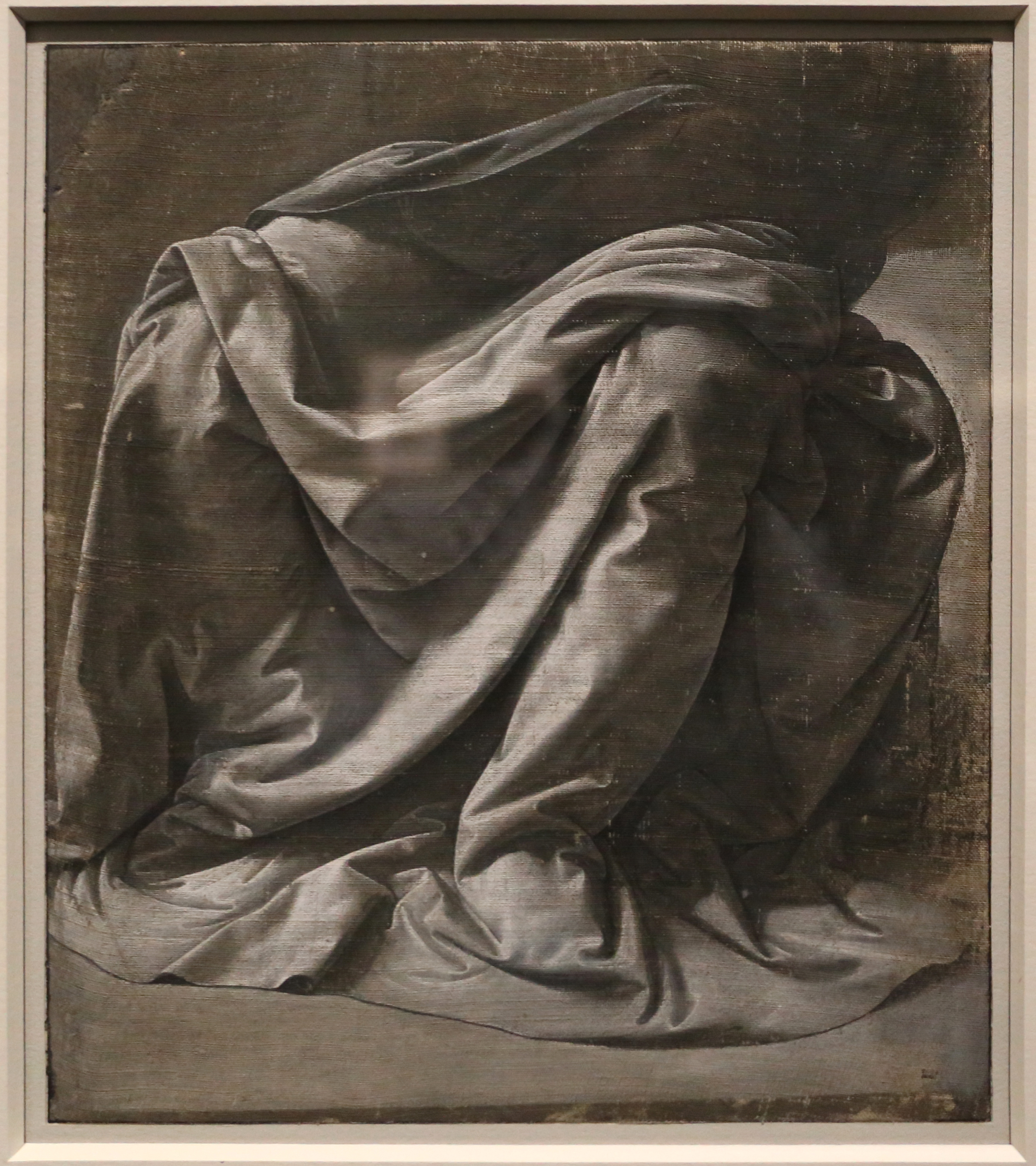
Leonardo da Vinci, Drapery Study for a Seated Figure, c. 1475–1480, Louvre, inv. no. 2255

The Drapery Study for the Virgin presents a certain complexity in its drawing. The pleating of the fabric varies in depth, and the movements of the body it embraces are intertwined. Despite their disparate proportions, the design unifies the two legs and reveals the "live animation" of the fabric's fall on the figure's hip through skilfully rounded pleats. This unity in the design results in a notable effect of volume, keeping with the tradition of classical sculpture.

The drapery in this drawing demonstrates the artist's ability to balance movement and illustrates the intention to portray the Virgin's stability. The subject is seated on his mother's lap, with only her left foot supporting him. The drapery also reveals a double movement, that of a person leaning forward and about to stand up, as reflected in the tension of the right leg.

Finally, the drawing for the Drapery Study for the Virgin demonstrates the artist's technical proficiency and the development of his skill over time. In contrast, the technique of the Drapery Study for a Seated Figure (inv. no. 2255 in the Louvre's Department of Graphic Arts), dated c. 1475, is based on a dichromatic method, which emphasizes contrasts between light and shadow. The Drapery Study for the Virgin is based on the soft alternation of light and shadow, which results in the illuminated parts no longer defining the image but rather the shadows, which represent the exceptionally volumetric quality of the image.

== Posterity ==
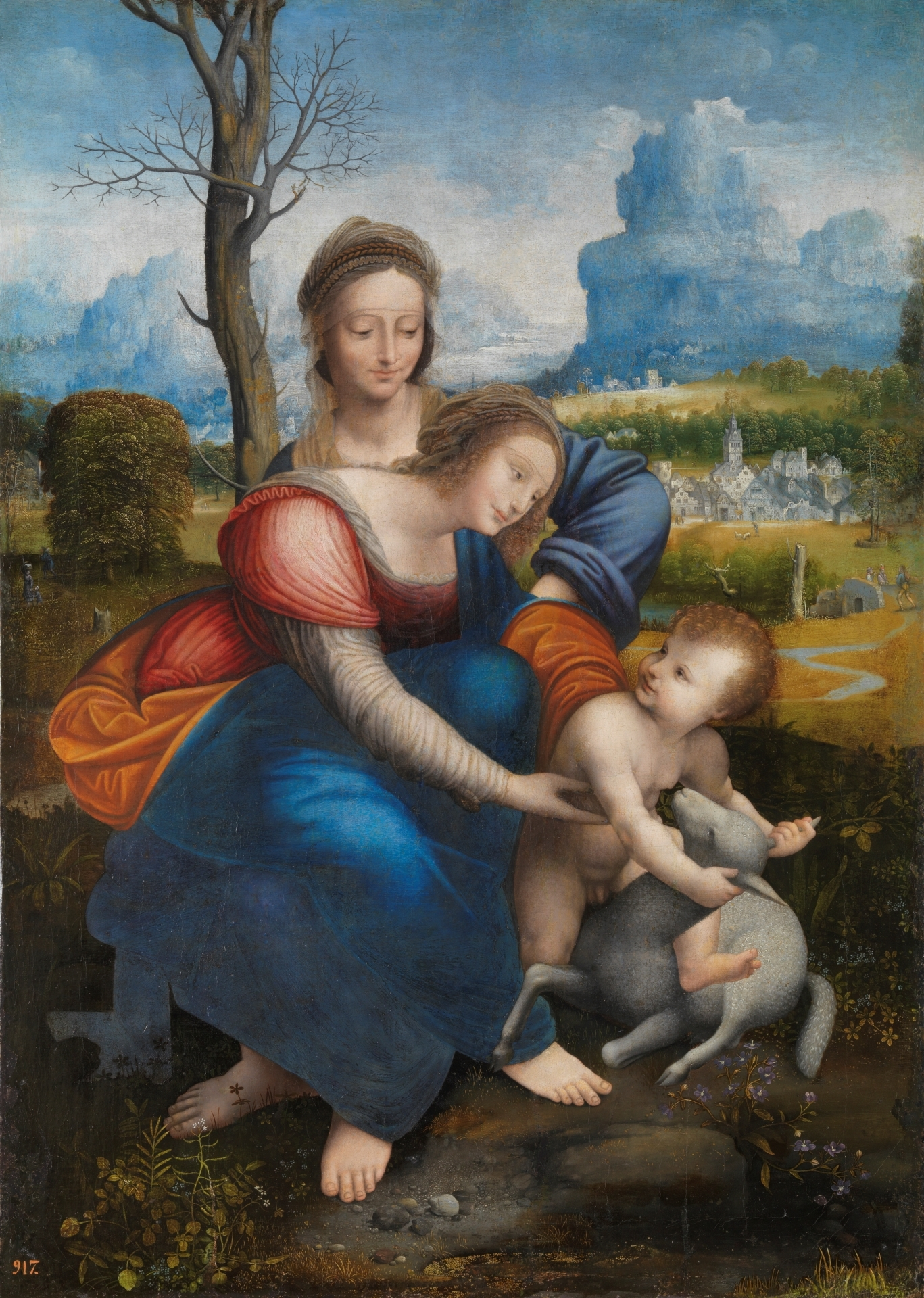
Studio of Leonardo da Vinci, The Virgin and Child with Saint Anne, c. 1508–1513 (?), Museo del Prado, Madrid

If the drawing was not copied, it was reproduced in copies of the painting by members of Leonardo's studio. The studio versions based on the Drapery Study for the Virgin are easily identifiable as they feature the characteristic motif of the cloth falling over the Virgin's hip, a motif simplified in the final painting. The study can be found among existing copies, for example, in a workshop piece from c. 1508–1513 at the Museo del Prado in Madrid.

== See also ==
- Leonardo da Vinci, A Memory of His Childhood
- List of works by Leonardo da Vinci

== Bibliography ==
- Bramly, Serge (2019). "10". Léonard de Vinci: Une biographie (in French). JC Lattès. ISBN 978-2709663236.
- Hohenstatt, Peter (1998). Léonard de Vinci: 1452–1519 (in French). Translated by Catherine Métais-Bührendt. Könemann. ISBN 3829007116.
- Pedretti, Carlo; Taglialagamba, Sara (2017). Léonard de Vinci: L'art du dessin (in French). Translated by Renaud Temperini. Citadelles et Mazenod. ISBN 978-2850887253.
- Vezzosi, Alessandro (2010). "5". Léonard de Vinci: Art et science de l'univers (in French). Translated by Françoise Liffran. Découvertes Gallimard. pp. 104–128. ISBN 978-2070348800.
- Zöllner, Frank; Nathan, Johannes (2014). Léonard de Vinci, 1452–1519: L'œuvre graphique (in French). Translated by Wolf Fruhtrunk. Taschen. ISBN 9783836554404.
- Delieuvin, Vincent; et al. (Françoise Barbe, Cécile Beuzelin, Sue Ann Chui, Pierre Curie, Myriam Eveno, Élisabeth Foucart-Walter, Louis Frank, Cecilia Frosinini, Ana González Mozo, Sophie Guillot de Suduiraut, Claurio Gulli, Bruno Mottin, Cinzia Pasquali, Alan Phenix, Cristina Quattrini, Élisabeth Ravaud, Cécile Scailliérez and Naoko Takahatake) (2012). La Sainte Anne: l'ultime chef-d'œuvre de Léonard de Vinci – Exposition présentée à Paris au musée du Louvre du 29 mars au 25 juin 2012 (in French). Paris: Louvre éditions. pp. 140–141. ISBN 978-88-89854-87-7.
- Delieuvin, Vincent; Frank, Louis (2019). Léonard de Vinci (catalogue officiel de l'exposition) (in French). Hazan. pp. 258–289. ISBN 978-2754111232.
- Viatte, Françoise; Forcione, Varena (2003). "86. Draperie enveloppant les jambes d'une figure assise". Léonard de Vinci: Dessins et manuscrits (exposition) (in French). Paris: Réunion des musées nationaux. pp. 257–261. ISBN 2-7118-4589-3.
- Viatte, Françoise; et al. (Carmen C. Bambach, Carlo Vecce, Carlo Pedretti, Françoise Viatte, Alessandro Cecchi, Martin Kemp, Pietro C. Marani, Claire Farago, Varena Forcione, Anne-Marie Logan and Linda Wolk-Simon) (2003). Leonardo da Vinci, master draftsman (New York Metropolitan Museum of Art Series). New York: Metropolitan Museum of Art. pp. 242–722. ISBN 978-0300098785.
- Zöllner, Frank (2017). Léonard de Vinci, 1452–1519: tout l'œuvre peint (in French). Taschen. ISBN 978-3836562966.
