= Leonardo's self-propelled cart =

Automobile-like invention of da Vinci

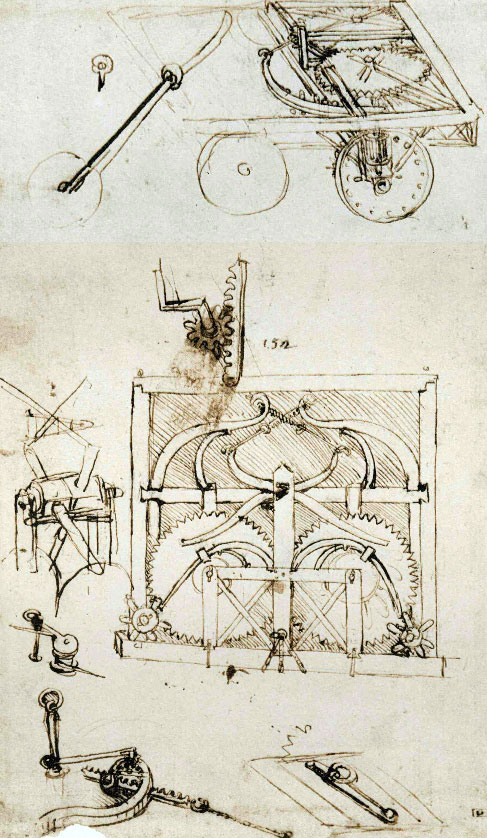
The original design of the self-propelled cart (Codex Atlanticus, f.812 r)

Leonardo's self-propelled cart is an invention designed by Leonardo da Vinci, considered the ancestor of the modern automobile.

== Description ==
The machine is powered by two symmetric springs hidden in drum-like casings. While one spring would be enough to move the device, two symmetric springs probably looked like a more "logically perfect" solution. Leonardo had been well aware that the powering force provided by the springs drops significantly when they unwind. In order to deliver smooth and stable motion, the machine features a balance wheel, as used in clocks. The control mechanism is quite complex and allows it to follow a pre-programmed path automatically. The machine also features a mechanism similar to a differential that in addition allows the turning angle to be set.

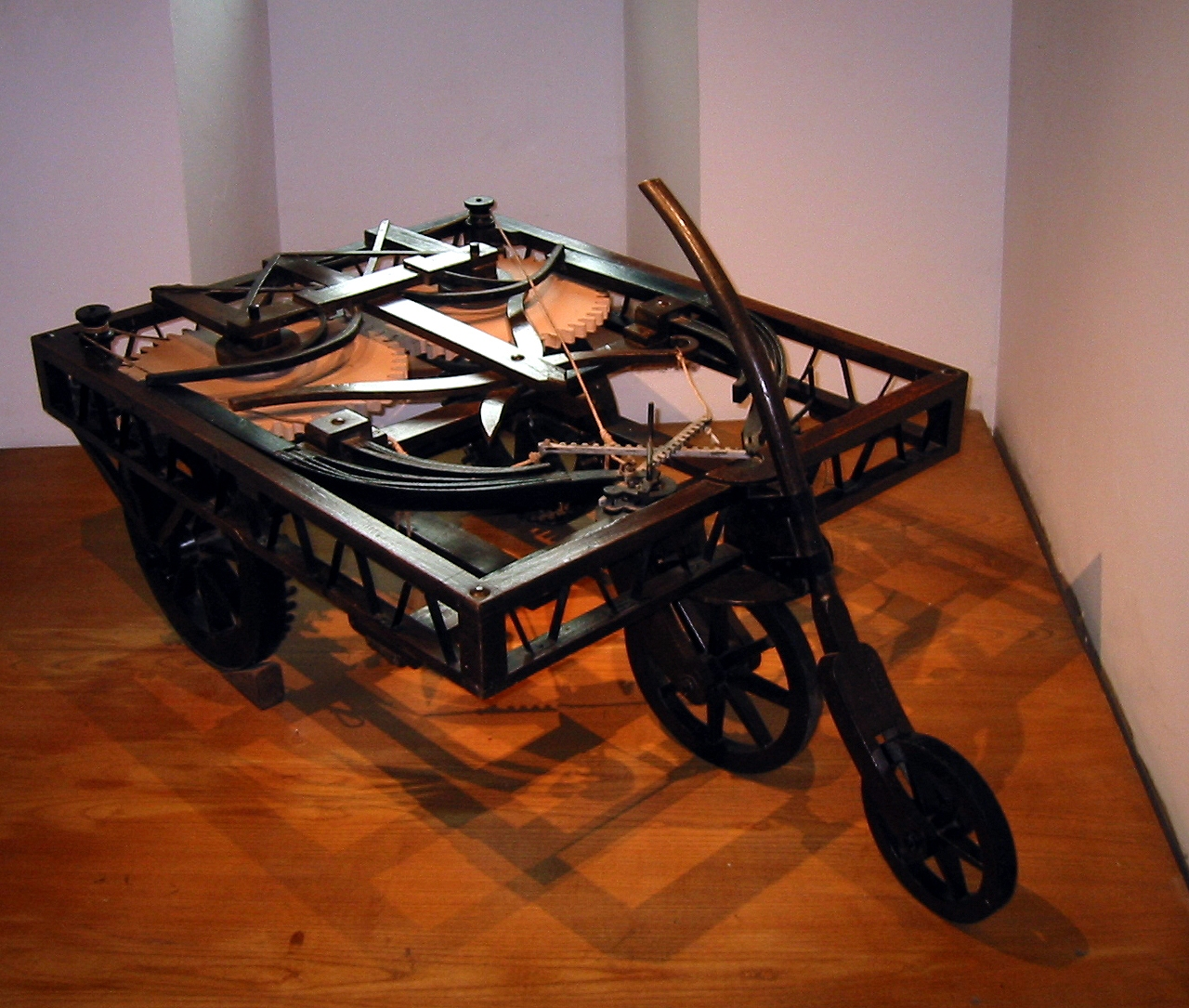
A self-propelled cart replica at museum Clos Lucé

A replica of the self-propelled cart is kept at the museum Clos Lucé, near Château d'Amboise, in France. The television show Doing DaVinci also made a replica in 2009.

== See also ==
- Atlantic Codex
- List of works by Leonardo the Vinci
- Science and inventions of Leonardo the Vinci
