= William Duggan =

William Duggan may refer to:

- Willie Duggan (1950–2017), Irish rugby union player
- Bill Duggan (born 1974), American actor
- Billy Duggan (1884–1934), Australian trade unionist

== See also ==
- William Dugan (disambiguation)
- Duggan (surname)
