= The Death of Leonardo da Vinci =

Painting by Jean-Auguste-Dominique Ingres

- Francis I Receives the Last Breaths of Leonardo da Vinci
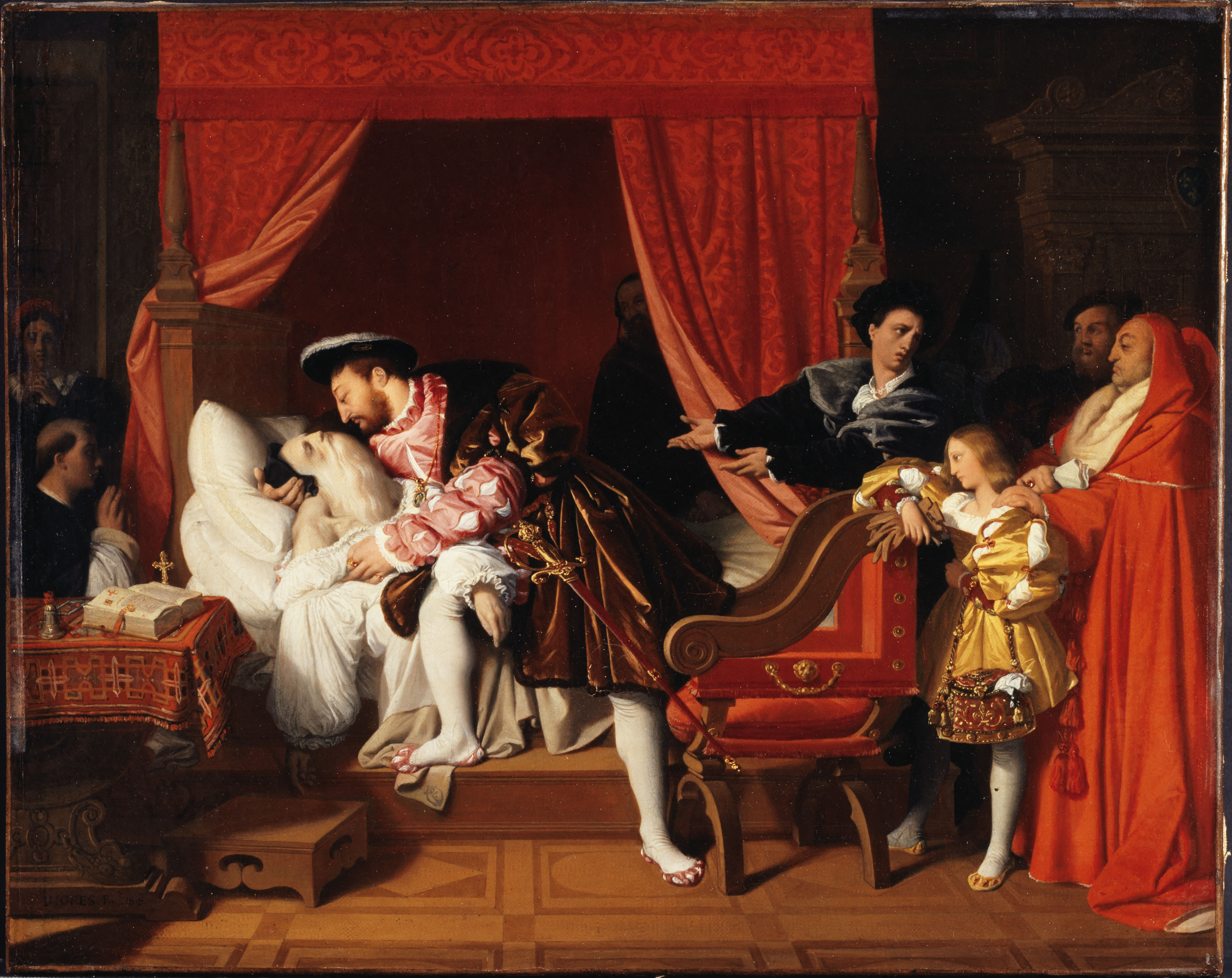
- Artist: Jean-Auguste-Dominique Ingres
- Year: 1818
- Medium: oil paint, canvas
- Dimensions: 40, 40, 72 cm (16, 16, 28 in) × 50.5, 81.5 cm (19.9, 32.1 in) × 8.5 cm (3.3 in)
- Location: Petit Palais
- Commissioner: Pierre Louis Jean Casimir de Blacas
- Accession: PDUT1165

The Death of Leonardo da Vinci or Francis I Receives the Last Breaths of Leonardo da Vinci is an 1818 oil painting by the French artist Jean-Auguste-Dominique Ingres, which shows the Italian artist and inventor Leonardo da Vinci on his deathbed on May 2, 1519, with Francis I of France holding his head. It was commissioned by Pierre Louis Jean Casimir de Blacas, the French ambassador in Rome, and is currently housed in the Petit Palais in Paris. Another version of the painting created c. 1851 is held by the Smith College Museum of Art.

== Subject matter ==
The painting depicts the death of the Italian Renaissance polymath Leonardo da Vinci, which took place in the Clos Lucé house, in Amboise, on May 2, 1519. Ingres based his scene on the narrative of the event in Giorgio Vasari's Lives of the Artists. Vasari's account, which was not wholly accurate, contains the sentence: "To show him favour and to soothe his pain, the king held his head." Ingres was inspired by this moment in the text, seeing it as a subtle symbol of the end of a glorious artistic era.

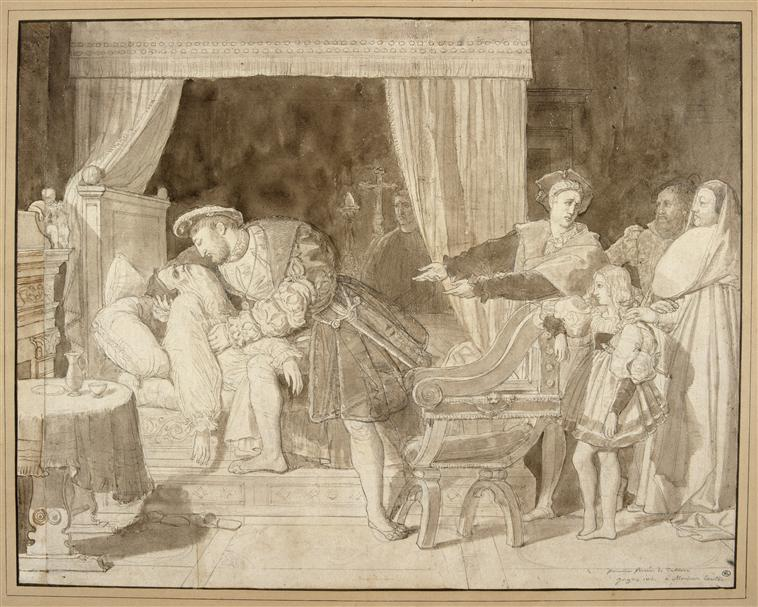
Ingres, The Death of Leonardo da Vinci, c. 1817

Ingres first conceived of the work in a wash drawing he submitted to Louis-Joseph Coutan in the 1820s. Ingres made several alterations to the original wash drawing, including extending the format horizontally by adding a piece of paper on the left. He also modified the curtain on the right side of the bed and included the figure of a young priest behind it as an afterthought. Additionally, he used a paper cut-out to adjust the hand of the cardinal on the right and made numerous revisions to the figures' contours and the drapery.

This painting serves as a dual tribute, honouring both the great artists of the past and promoting Ultra-Royalist political ideologies. Much like in Henri IV and The Spanish Ambassador, Ingres emphasizes several key Ultra-Royalist themes in this work: the alliance of the throne and the altar, the significance of royal virtues such as humanity and humility, and the Crown's generosity in supporting the fine arts.

== Composition and analysis ==
Leonardo's religious interests are symbolized by the draped table, handbell, missal, crucifix, and the monk depicted on the left side of the painting. A subtle tribute to Leonardo's quest for perfection is found in the small medallion across his chest, the King's Ordre de Saint Michel. This honour, awarded for artistic and scholarly achievement during both the Ancien Régime and the Restoration, also granted its recipients the status of nobility. The medallion is positioned in the style of a boutonniere, as it was worn in the 19th century. In this way, Ingres, after Leonardo's death, acknowledges his artistic greatness and elevates him to nobility. This choice may imply that Ingres believed Leonardo did not receive adequate recognition or reward from his royal patrons during his lifetime.

The servants and friends that Vasari refers to are visible in the background of the painting. Behind the bed, the shadowy figure of the doctor can be seen, his demeanor and his hands resting motionless on the bed signaling that his involvement in determining Leonardo's fate has concluded. The distraught figure to the right of the bed has been identified as Leonardo's wealthy friend and student, Francesco Melzi. The abruptness of Leonardo's death is conveyed through the tilted chair, showing where the king had just leapt from, and his dynamic posture. The king's affection for Leonardo is hinted at by the absence of gloves and the closeness of his face to Leonardo's.

== See also ==
- List of paintings by Jean-Auguste-Dominique Ingres
- Cultural references to Leonardo da Vinci
