= Doing DaVinci =

- Genre: Popular science
- Starring: Valek Sykes; Bill Duggan; Flash Hopkins; Jurgen Heimann; Alan Bovinett; Terry Sandin
- Country of origin: United States
- Original language: English
- No. of seasons: 2
- No. of episodes: 10

Original release
- Network: Discovery Channel
- Release: April 13, 2009 – August 23, 2010

Doing DaVinci is a popular science television program originally aired on the Discovery Channel in which the hosts attempted to create many of Leonardo da Vinci's inventions. The show aired on a weekly schedule with the first episode broadcast on April 13, 2009.

== Team ==
The inventions are created by a team of six members:

- Valek Sykes, a special effects expert and mechanical designer, actor, owner of Tech Works Studios and Exit Biohazard and Crime Scene Cleanup
- Bill Duggan, a carpenter and the host of Curb Appeal
- Flash Hopkins, an artist, builder, and long time Burning Man personality
- Jurgen Heimann, a designer and puppeteer
- Alan Bovinett, an entrepreneur and mechanical engineer.
- Terry Sandin, a mechanical and animatronics engineer and a host of Prototype This!

The team consults with da Vinci researcher Jonathan Pevsner to understand the inventions and decide on materials for their construction.

== Construction ==
The team first consults with Jonathan Pevsner to decide on materials and map out the basics of the design. The invention is then reconstructed in Autodesk Inventor and Autodesk's Digital Prototyping solutions. Then the team heads to a workshop to begin construction. After the invention is completed it is tested to determine whether or not the build was a success.

== Episodes ==
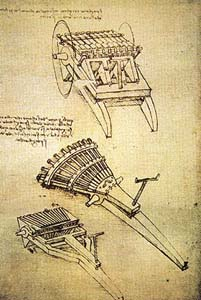
"Machine Gun"

No.	Title	Original release date
1	"Armored Tank"	April 13, 2009
The team creates an armored gear-propelled tank operated by an eight-man team and capable of firing in a full 360° range.
2	"Siege Ladder"	April 20, 2009
The crew attempts to build the renaissance master's most massive design: a towering three-story siege ladder. But as creative differences arise, tension threatens to pull the team apart.
3	"Scythe Chariot"	April 27, 2009
The danger level hits a new high when the team devotes their talent to recreating Leonardo's deadly bladed chariot. But instead of horsepower, the team updates Da Vinci's 15th century design with robot power.
4	"Machine Gun"	May 4, 2009
The team creates a multi-barrel cannon capable of firing eleven shots at once.
5	"Self Propelled Carts"	May 11, 2009
The hosts split into two teams and compete to build the fastest self propelled cart.
6	"Catapult"	May 18, 2009
The crew tries to re-create a giant catapult but discovers building the bow that powers the device is more complicated than expected.
7	"Air Screw"	August 16, 2010
The team attempts to build the Air Screw, DaVinci's dream helicopter like device.
8	"Crossbow Machine"	August 23, 2010
The team builds Leonardo's Crossbow Machine, a massive structure designed to automatically load four large crossbows.
9	"Double Shot Catapult"	September 22, 2010 (South East Asia)
The team takes on the most deviously complex war machine.
10	"Springald Cannon"	September 29, 2010 (South East Asia)
