= William Dugan =

William Dugan may refer to:

- Bill Dugan (born 1959), former professional American football player, offensive lineman
- Bill Dugan (baseball) (1864–1921), American baseball catcher

== See also ==
- William Duggan (disambiguation)
- Dugan (surname)
