= Bill Duggan =

American actor

- Born: December 18, 1974 (age 50); San Francisco, California, United States
- Occupation: Actor

Bill Duggan (born December 18, 1974) is an American actor. He was raised in San Francisco, California. He was an active member of his grade school speech program. He began acting in high school, performing in school plays and musicals. He continued his training at Santa Clara University, where he received an acting scholarship. After majoring in Theater Arts, he followed his childhood dream to the city of Los Angeles, California, where he hoped to begin a career on more than just the stage.

Bill's credits include many television commercials and print ads. As an actor, he has appeared on shows such as The Shield, Nash Bridges and General Hospital, The Girl Next Door, Rapid Guy Movement, Dangerous Minds, Copycat, First Years, Zoom Experience and hosted HGTV's Curb Appeal. His theater credits include Eugene in Brighton Beach Memoirs, Gary in Noises Off, Claudio in Much Ado About Nothing & Measure for Measure, Lucas in Laughter on the 23rd Floor, Paul in A Chorus Line, and Baby John in West Side Story. Other shows include: Camelot, South Pacific, A Lady in the Dark, Grapes of Wrath, Stand-Up Tragedy. His newest and current credit is host of the television pre-game show on The CW for the 49ers home games.

Bill began serving as a do-it-yourself guest expert for HSN, formerly the Home Shopping Network, in May 2008.

He was the on-air handyman for the Discovery Channel's Doing DaVinci, where four guys attempt to build Leonardo da Vinci's inventions.

When not on stage, Bill has also worked in politics helping elected officials provide service to their constituents. He has worked on Capitol Hill with Senator Dianne Feinstein and at San Francisco City Hall with former Supervisor Kevin Shelley.
