= Clos Lucé =

Château du Clos Lucé
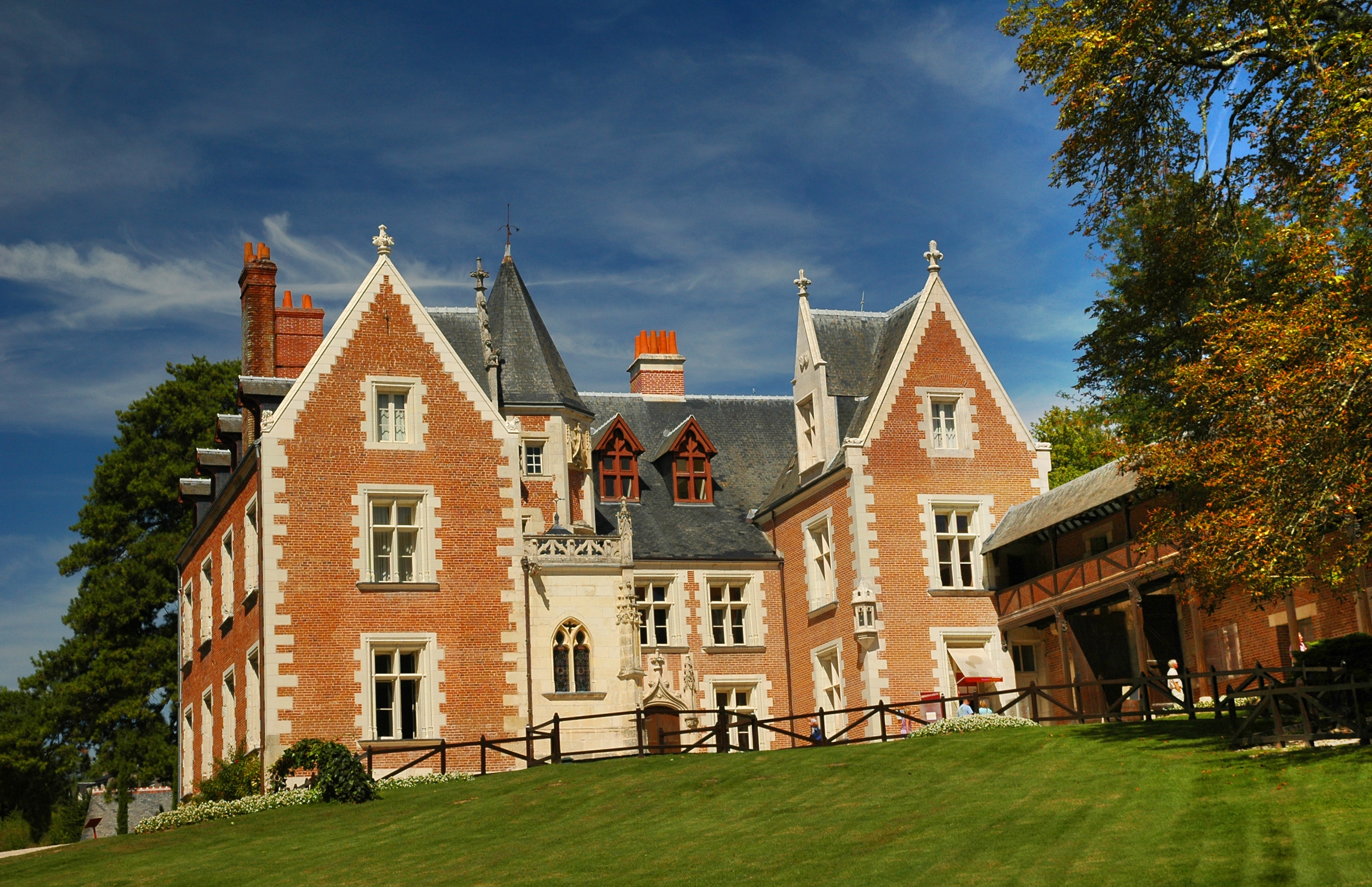

- Location within France
- Former names: Manoir du Cloux

General information
- Type: Château
- Architectural style: Flamboyant and Renaissance
- Location: Amboise, France
- Coordinates: 47.4102299°N 0.9915248°E
- Owner: Saint-Bris family

Website
- Official website of the Clos Lucé

The Château du Clos Lucé (French pronunciation: [ʃato dy klo lyse]; or simply Clos Lucé), formerly called Manoir du Cloux, is a château located in the center of Amboise, in the department of Indre-et-Loire, in the Centre-Val de Loire region of France. It is located in the Val de Loire, in the historical region of Touraine. Built by Hugues d'Amboise in 1471, the palace has known several famous owners such as the French king Charles VIII and Leonardo da Vinci. Clos Lucé is 500 metres from the royal Château d'Amboise, to which it is connected by an underground passageway.

King Charles VIII bought the home from Étienne Le Loup in 1490 and during this time it became known as the ‘summer house’, housing French royalty. After a few decades Francis I gave it to Leonardo da Vinci when he invited him to live in France in 1516. The ageing polymath lived his last years in this house until his death on 2 May 1519.

The Death of Leonardo da Vinci, an 1818 oil painting by the French artist Jean-Auguste-Dominique Ingres, depicts Leonardo da Vinci on his deathbed at Clos Lucé on May 2, 1519, with Francis I of France holding his head. Another version of the painting created c. 1851 is held by the Smith College Museum of Art.

Thanks to its famous owners, this house today ranks as an ‘historic monument’ and therefore is protected from demolition or reconstruction. After 1855 it became a well-known museum about Leonardo da Vinci's life, work and memory, which was put together and directed by The Saint-Bris family, the current owners of the property.

== History ==
=== The Middle-Ages and the Renaissance period ===
The house was built by Hugues d'Amboise on a Gallo-Roman foundation. It was organized around an octagonal tower, within which a spiral staircase stood. Around the spiral staircase were two buildings that had two floors each. The elegant facade made with pink bricks and whites stones was typical of the 15th century. Formally called Château de Cloux, the building was the property of the Chateau D’Amboise, and the lands of Lucé were annexed to the castle from the 14th century. At the time, the manor was surrounded by fortifications; only one still remains, the watchtower.

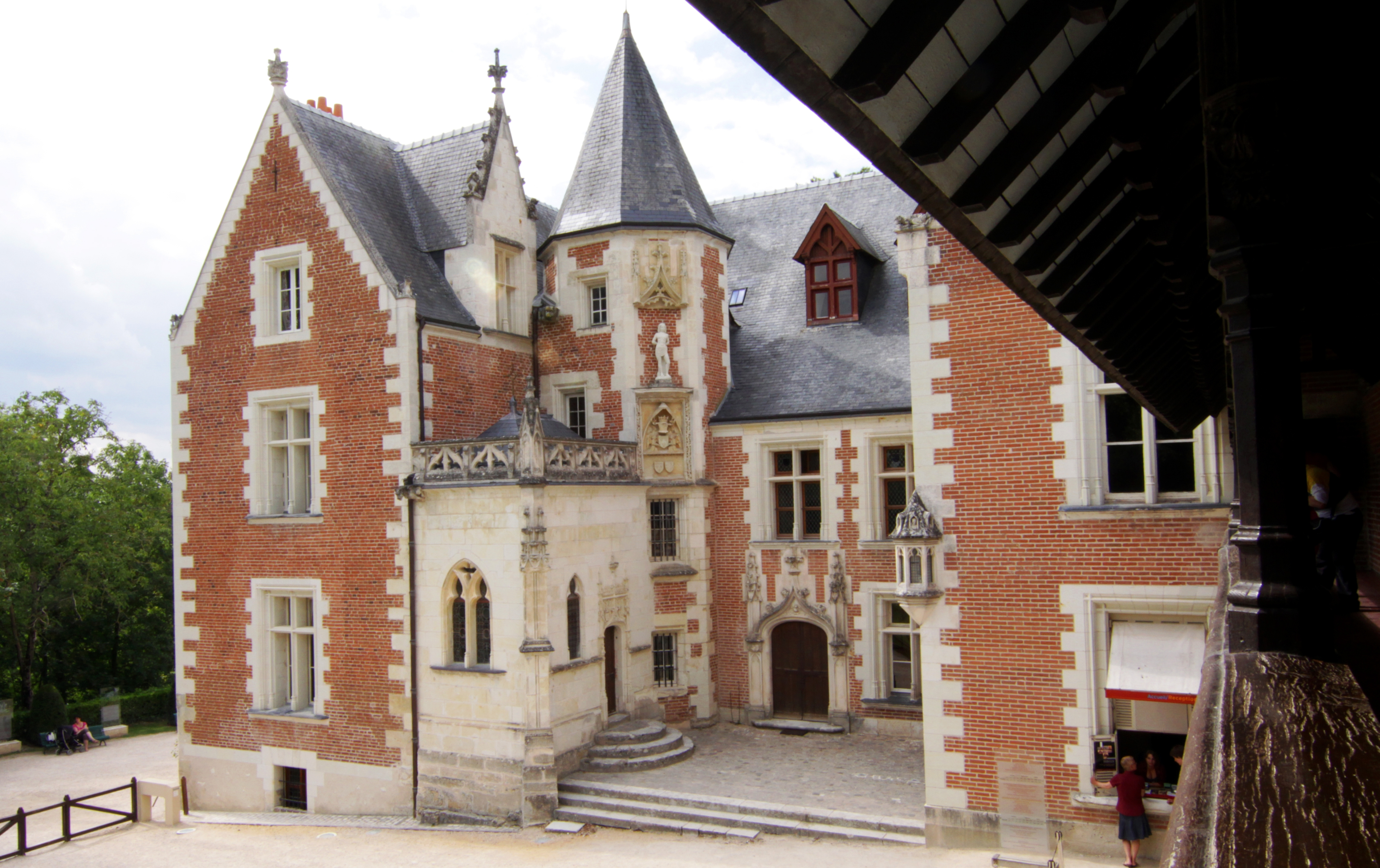
Walls made of tuffeau stone typical from the 15th century.

For a short time the building housed religious people of the abbaye of Moncé, they resided in the building until 1471. The Clos Lucé was then sold on 26 May to Etienne le Loup, who was Louis XI's Counselor and Amboise beadle. The building was in ruin when Etienne acquired the lands, he restored it giving it the famous visual aspect that we see today - a square tower with Gothic windows that created a towering and well protected medieval fortress.

==== Ownership by royalty ====
On the 2 July 1490, Charles VIII bought the castle from Etienne Le Loup for 3500 golden ecus and transformed the medieval stronghold into a more comfortable and habitable home. He also built a chapel for his wife, Anne of Brittany who lived at the Clos-Lucé until she left for the royal castle of Blois. It became known as ‘the summer house’ for the French royalty for 200 years.

The oratory was a chapel of the Gothic movement made with chalk stones (tuffeau) and decorated with murals painted by Leonardo's disciples: there is an Annunciation, a Last Judgement and a final painting called Virgo Lucis above the door, which may have gaiven its name to the castle. The museum also includes a copy of the Mona Lisa, painted in 1654 by Ambroise Dubois.

Between 1509 and 1515 the Castle housed Charles IV, Duke of Alençon and Marguerite de Navarre. The duke then sold the castle to Louise of Savoy, Regent of France, who took up residence and raised her two children there, one of whom was the Duke of Angoulême, destined to become the next king of France, Francis I and Marguerite de Navarre, intellectual and writer of the Heptaméron.

=== Leonardo da Vinci's years at the Clos Lucé ===
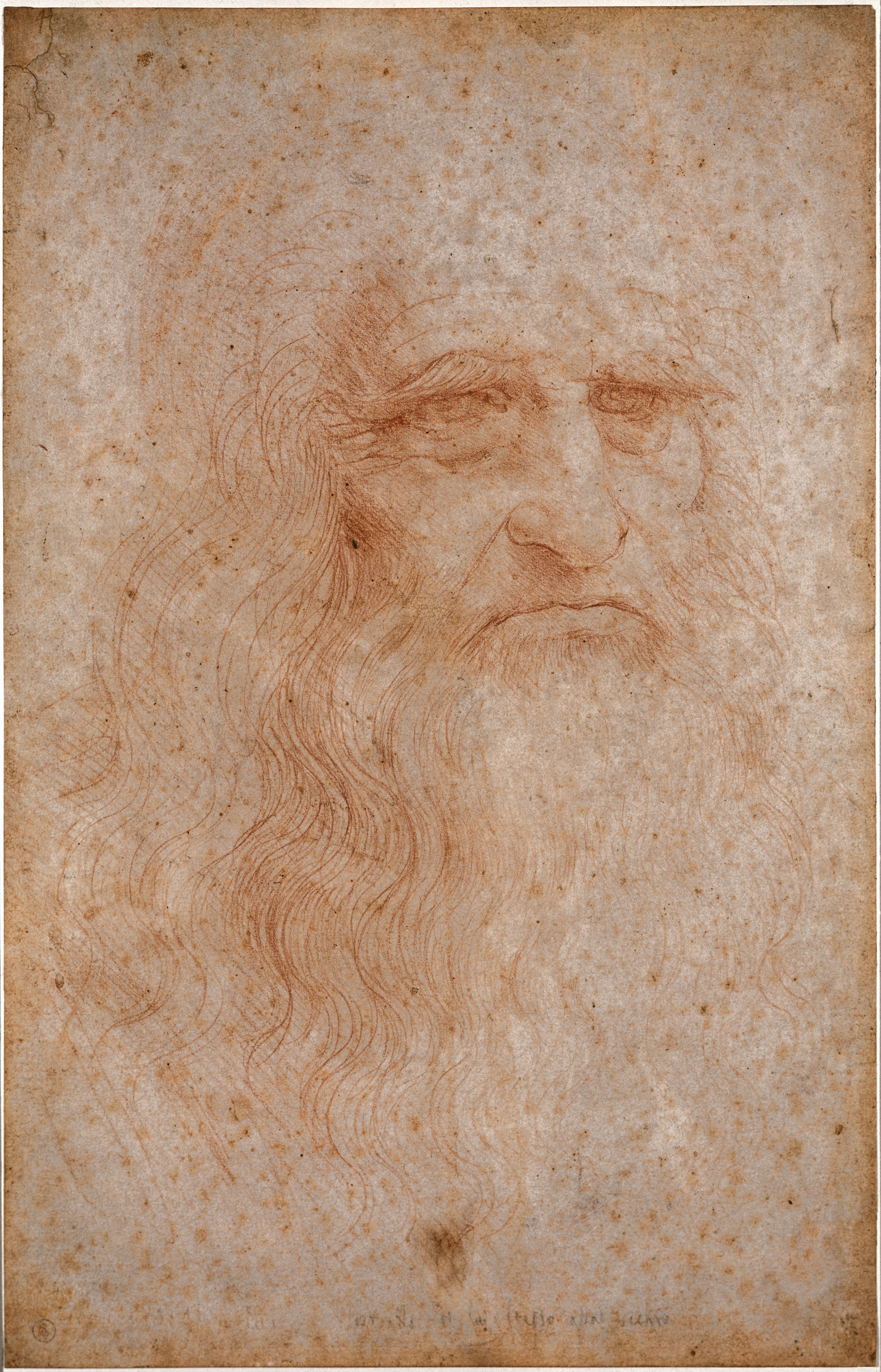
Leonardo da Vinci - self-portrait - Royal Library of Turin.

In 1516, aged 64, Leonardo da Vinci left Rome and traveled through Italy, armed with his sketchbooks and three of his most famous paintings: Mona Lisa, The Virgin and Child, with St. Anne and St. John the Baptist. They are now conserved in the Musée du Louvre, Paris. His disciples Francesco Melzi and Salaì followed him throughout his travels, as did his servant, Batista of Vilanis.

Benvenuto Cellini wrote that King Francis I gave Leonardo da Vinci a pension of 700 gold ecus, as well as buying his artwork, allowing him to live and work in the Clos Lucé. Leonardo da Vinci was appointed ‘The first painter, engineer and architect of the King’. Leonardo da Vinci was enthusiastic and productive during his years at the Clos Lucé. He worked on numerous projects, organized feasts for the court of Amboise, and even drew the famous “Double Spiral Staircase” of the Château de Chambord. He also spent time on other projects, one of them consisting of designing the perfect city of Romorantin. In this, Leonardo da Vinci wanted to dig a canal to connect two rivers allowing easier trade. He is still considered as one of the most renowned artists of his time.

On 10 October 1517, he was visited by the Cardinal Luigi d’Aragona, who was so impressed by his works of art that he described them in his Itinerario as “rare perfection”. These include some of his most famous pieces of work: the Mona Lisa and The Virgin and Child with St. Anne and St John the Baptist.

Leonardo organized a feast in the Château du Clos Lucé on 19 June 1518, to thank The French King Francis I for his multiple gifts and generosity. There were a lot of similarities with the feast that Leonardo organised in Milan on 13 January 1490 (Festa del paradisio, play of Bernardo Bellincioni): there was complex machinery to impress the guests, which referred to the movements of the celestial bodies thanks to a blue canvas which symbolized the heavens where ran planets, stars, the Sun, the Moon and the twelve zodiac signs.

Despite the rumors that he would die in the king's arms, Leonardo da Vinci died in his room at the Clos Lucé on 2 May 1519. He left his books, drawings, sketches and manuscripts to his beloved apprentice, Francesco Melzi.

=== From the Renaissance to Modern times ===
After Leonardo's death, Louise of Savoy took over the Chateau, however this did not last too long as Philibert Babou of the Bourdaisière and his wife succeeded her in 1523. The Chateau was then taken over by Michel of Gast, who was the Guards Captain under King Henri III of France and became the owner after the murder of the Cardinal of Guise by the king himself, in 1583.

In 1632, the marriage of Antoine d’Amboise and Michel de Gast's granddaughter brought the Chateau back in the hands of House Amboise. During the French Revolution the castle was miraculously spared and remained in the Amboise family until 1832 - it was then designed as a historical monument by the list of 1862.

Finally, the castle became the property of the Saint-Bris family on 30 July 1855, after ownership by the Amboise family who protected the property, by then, named Clos Lucé instead of Manoir du Cloux, during the French Revolution. The chateau was opened to the public in 1954 by Hubert and Agnès Saint Bris. A major restoration was completed in the 1960s. In 1979, Jean Saint Bris continued his parents' work. As of 2019, president of the family enterprise was François Saint Bris.

In 2017, the owners removed the 18th-century drawing rooms—which were listed as historical monuments—to create interiors intended to resemble those that existed during Leonardo's time. However, there are no surviving descriptions of the spaces Leonardo occupied, nor any remaining furniture. ·. This leads to a report being filed by the Direction régionale des Affaires culturelles with the Public Prosecutor.

=== The castle today ===
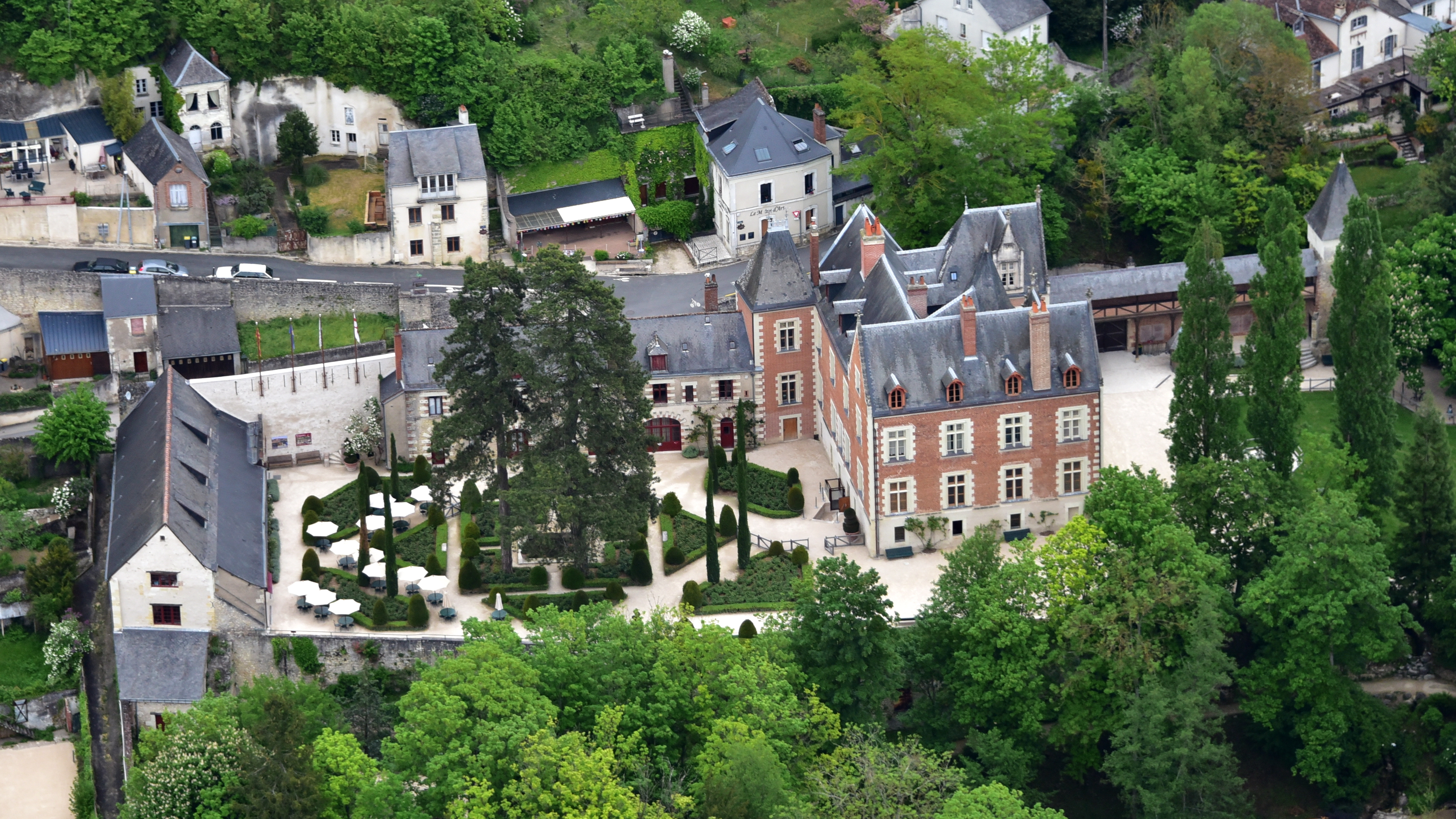
Overview, 2016

The castle is set in the heart of a 7-hectares park, crossed by the Amasse, a tributary of the Loire. The facade of the house is made with pink bricks and white stones and has remained almost unaltered since the Renaissance in which an old rampart walkway still remains. Within the castle, remain the rooms of Leonardo da Vinci, Anne of Brittany and Marguerite of Navarre, including the oratory and council rooms. The first floor bedrooms were restored in 2011 with period details and artifacts. There is a restaurant on site.

According to the Smithsonian, restoration over the years was extensive:

"the mansion has been restored to the way it appeared during Leonardo's stay there, including his bedroom, his basement studio, the original frescoes on the walls and the high stone hearth in the kitchen".

In the basement, there are 40 models that IBM made from Leonardo's sketches and drawings, including a helicopter, as well as some 3D animations about the Italian master's inventions, allowing the public to see them working. In the park is a pigeon house from the middle of 15th century built by Etienne le Loup, Amboise beadle that can shelter up to a thousand birds. In 2003, Jean Saint-Bris set up an educational and cultural course in the park of the Clos Lucé with several sound terminals and impressive machines inspired from Leonardo's mind. The open-air museum in the garden, with its forty translucent canvasses, houses full-size models of some Da Vinci inventions, including a chariot, a multi-barrelled gun, an aerial screw and a revolving bridge.

During 2019, the 500th anniversary of his death, Amboise held many events celebrating Da Vinci's life, some at Clos Lucé. The number of visitors to the chateau in 2019 was estimated as 500,000, a 30% increase over the typical annual number. Da Vinci is special to the French, according to François Saint Bris. "He lived a long time in France and he died here ... And 'La Joconde' [Mona Lisa] is in France. So ... for us, he's a little French."

== Gallery ==
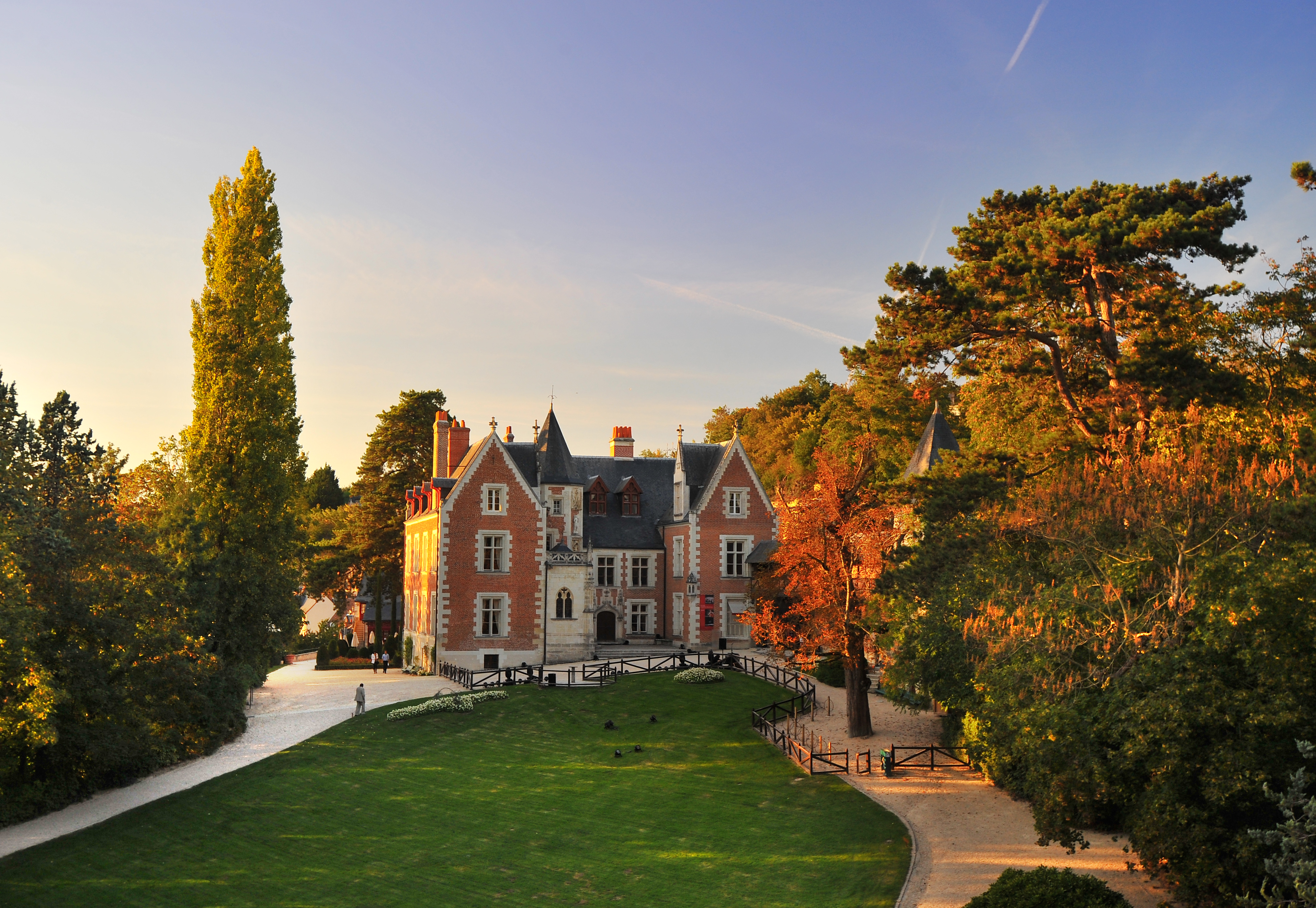
The château in 2011

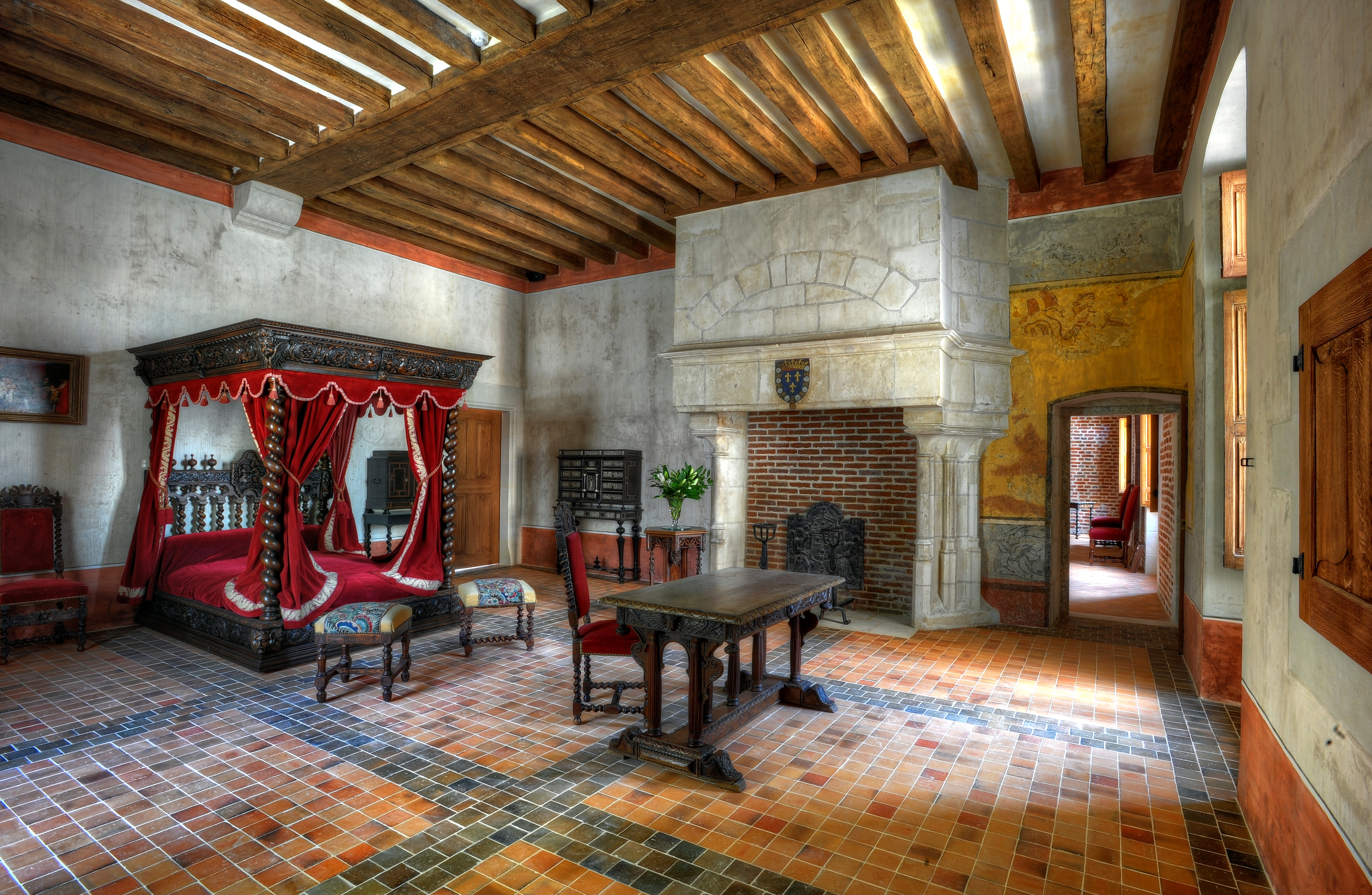
The chamber of Leonardo da Vinci

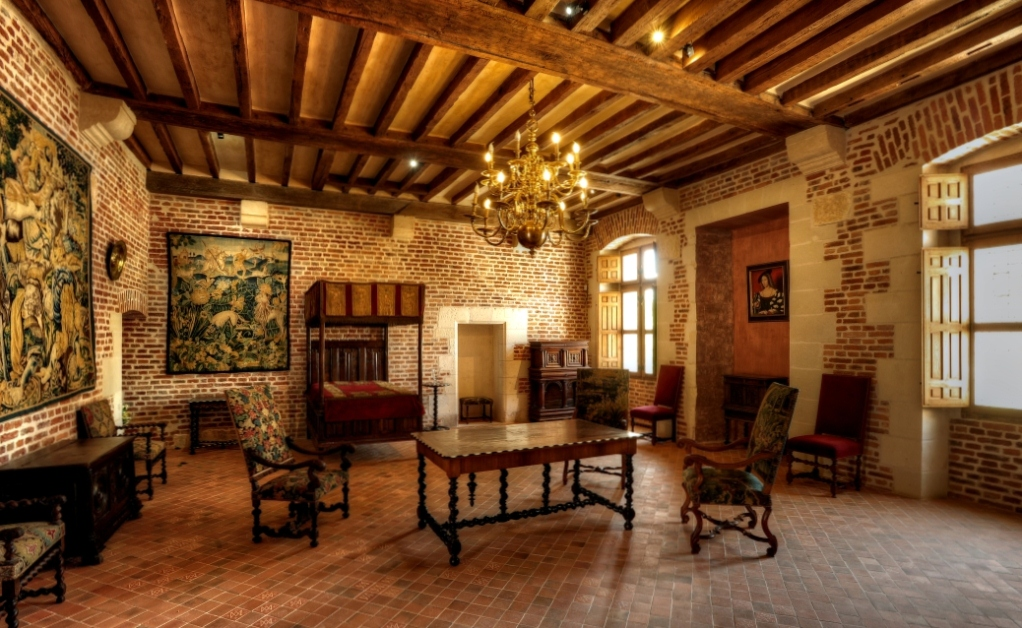
The chamber of Marguerite de Navarre

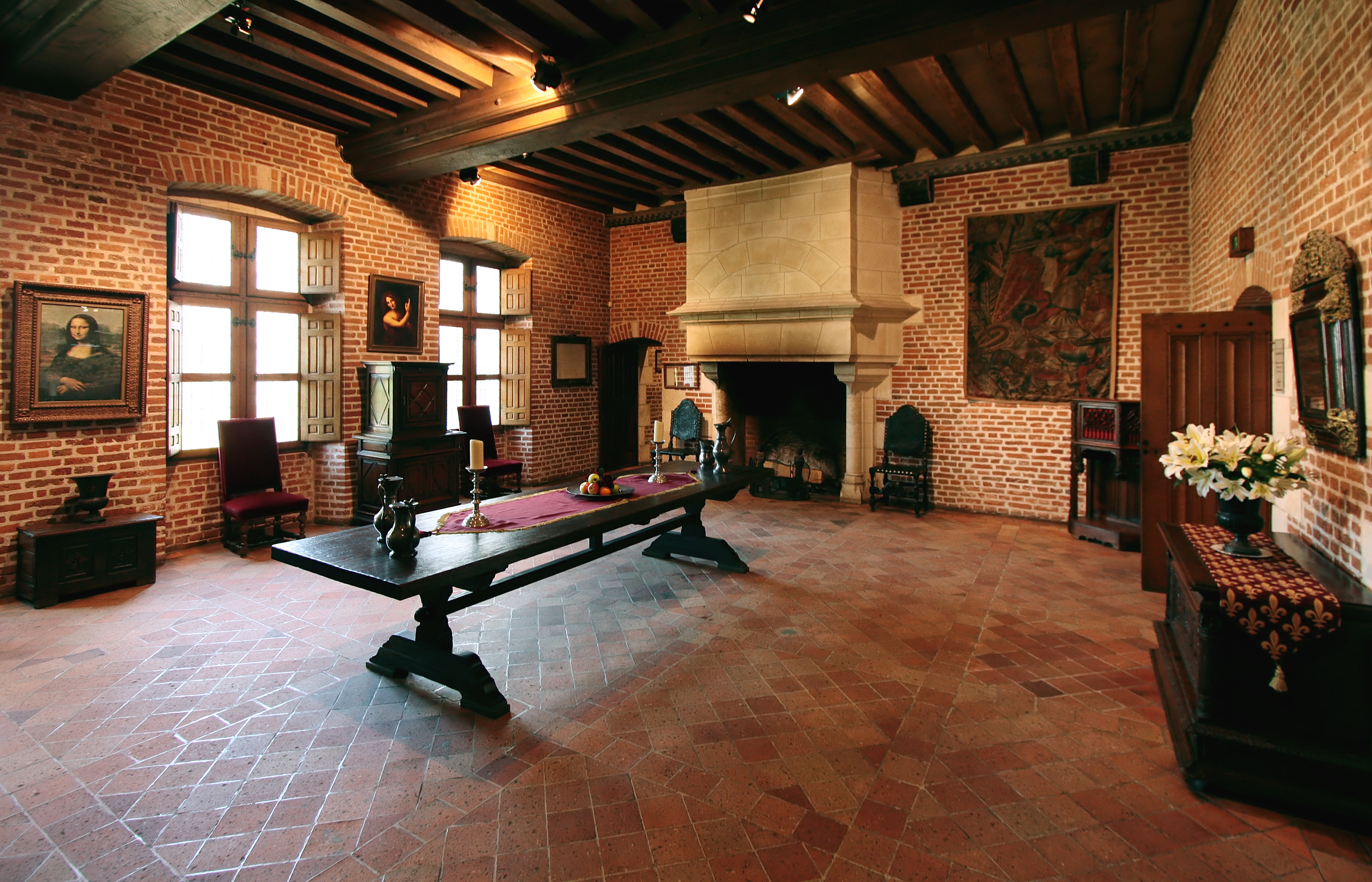
The great room

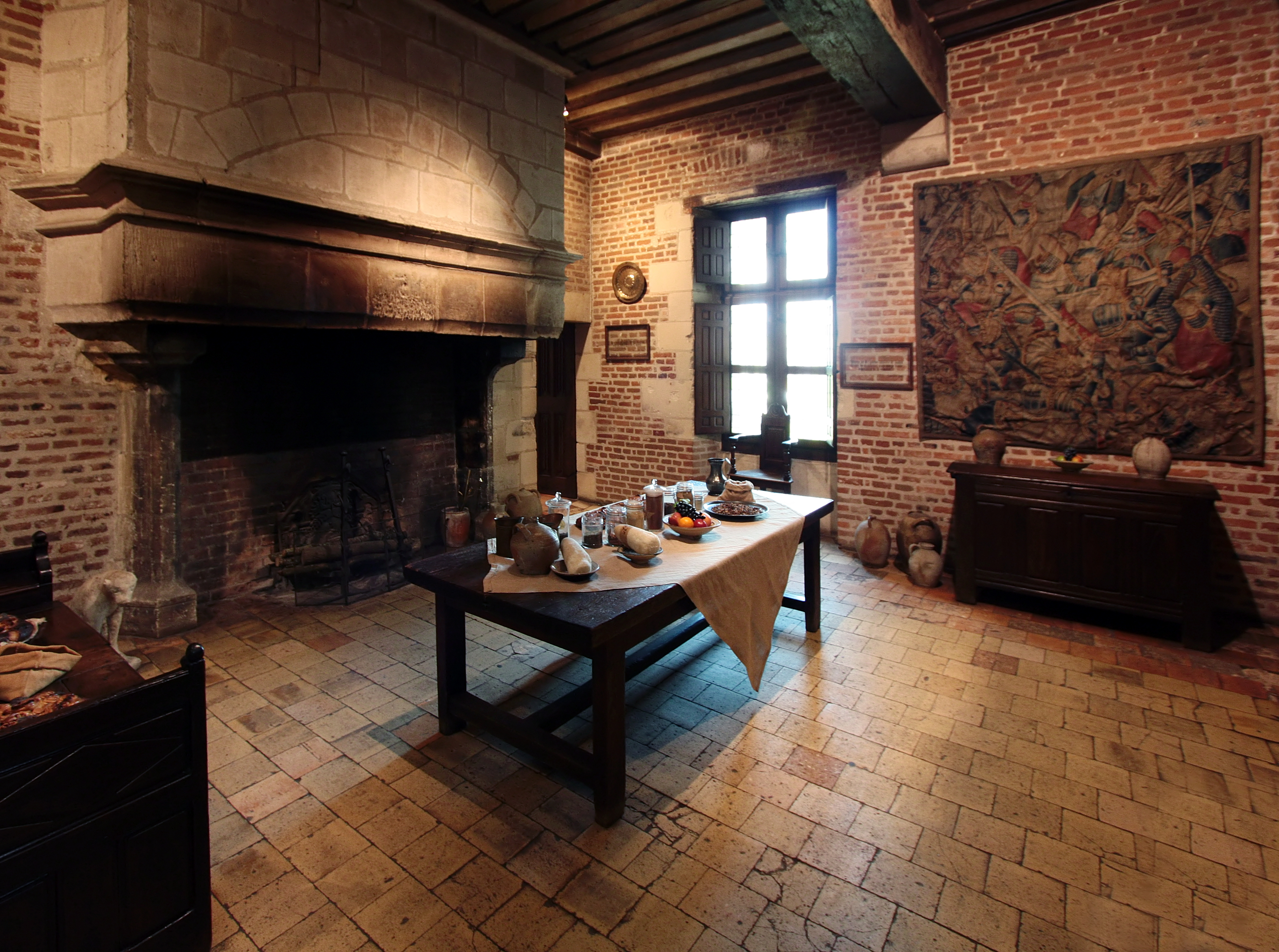
The kitchen

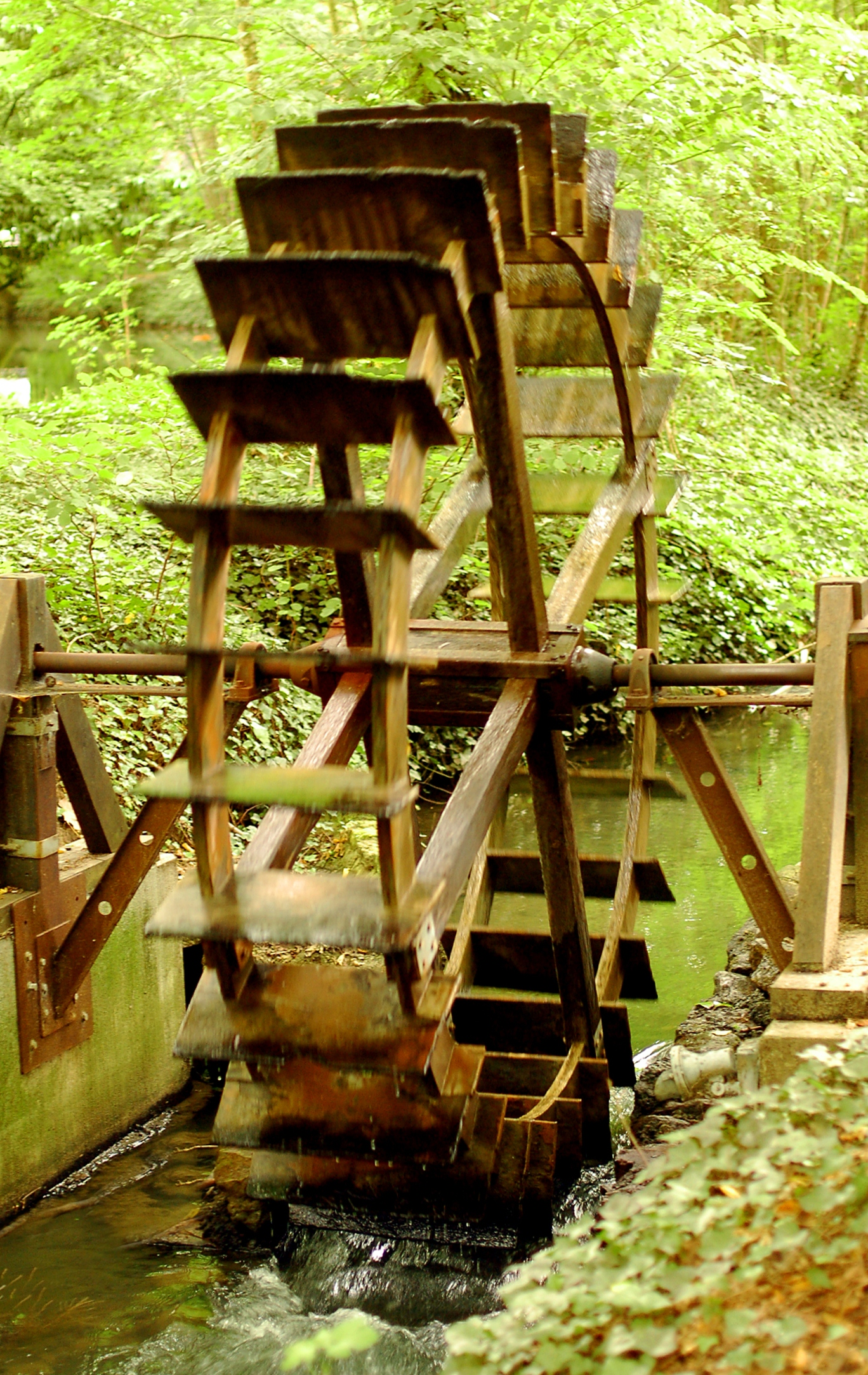
The paddle wheel

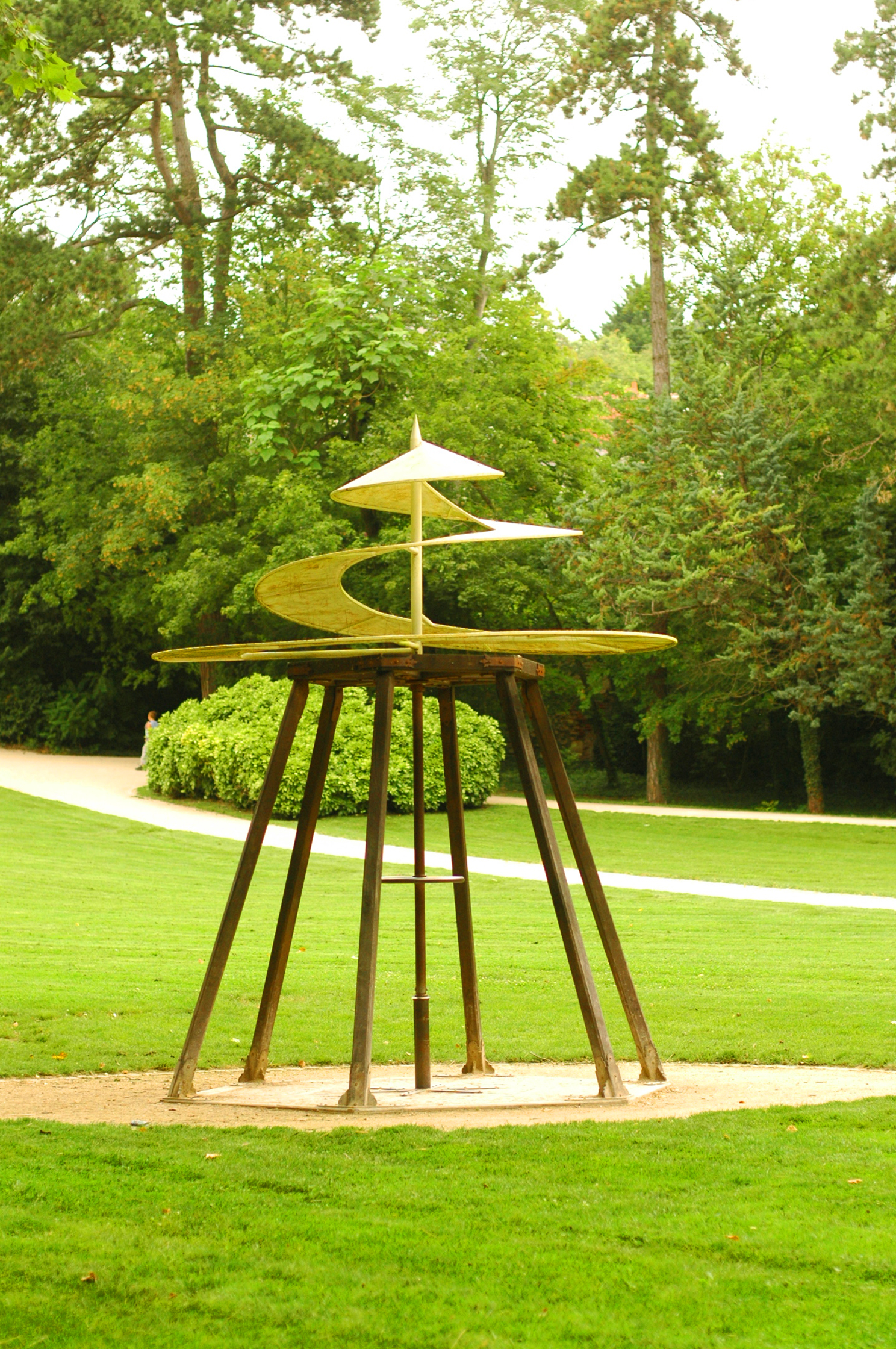
The helicopter

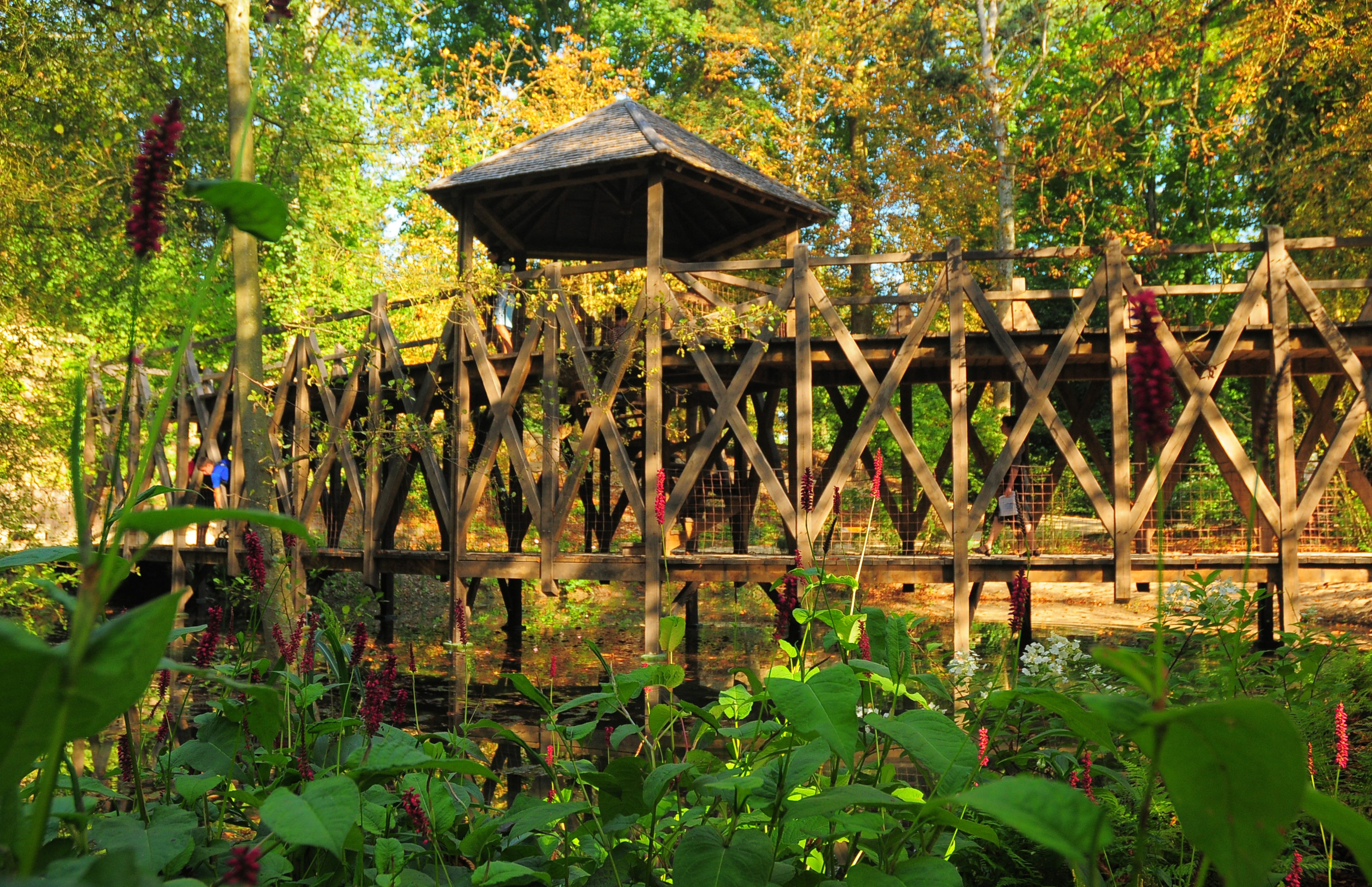
The two-level bridge

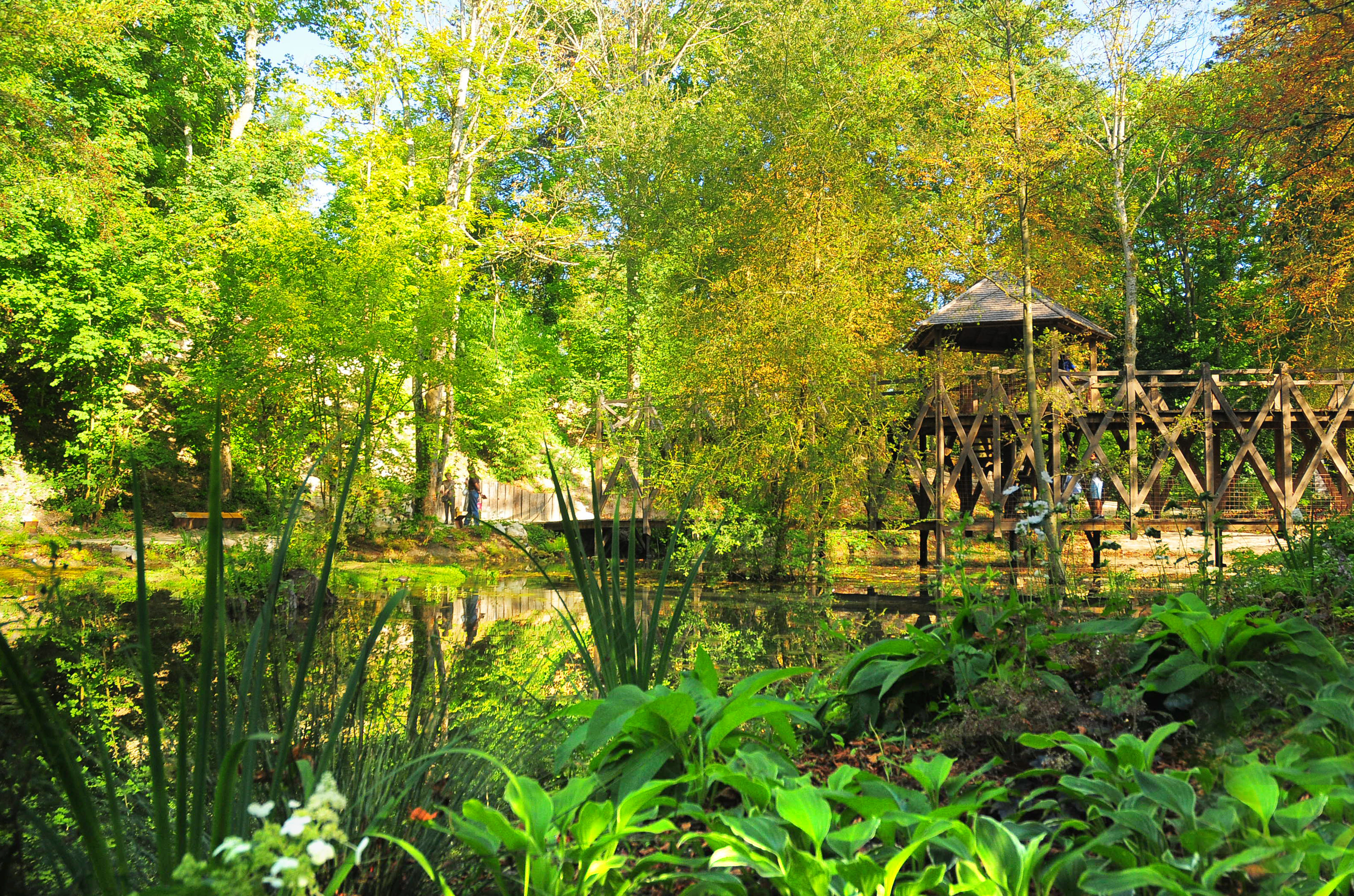
The garden of Leonardo

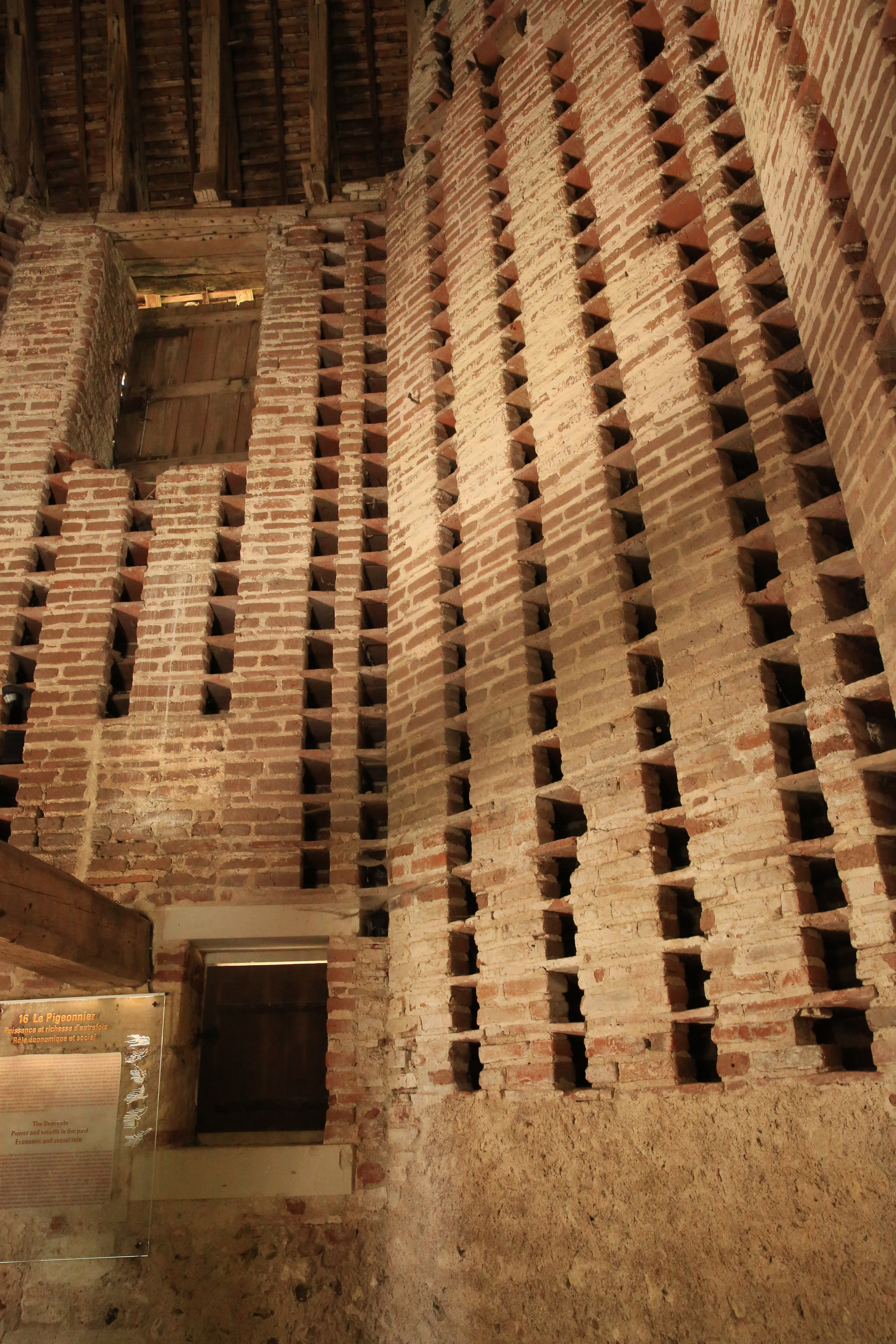
Pigeon-holes in the dovecote

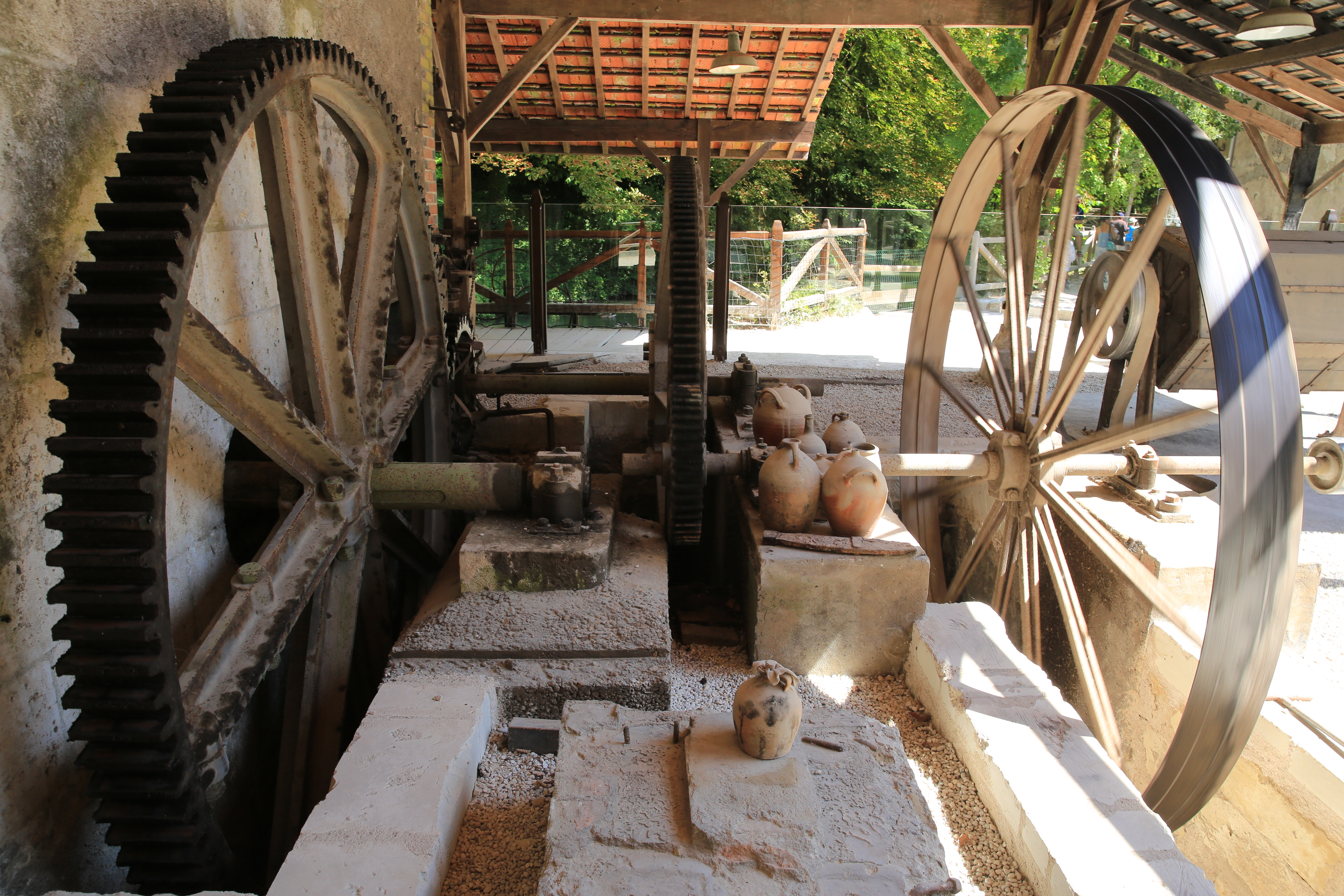
The water-mill

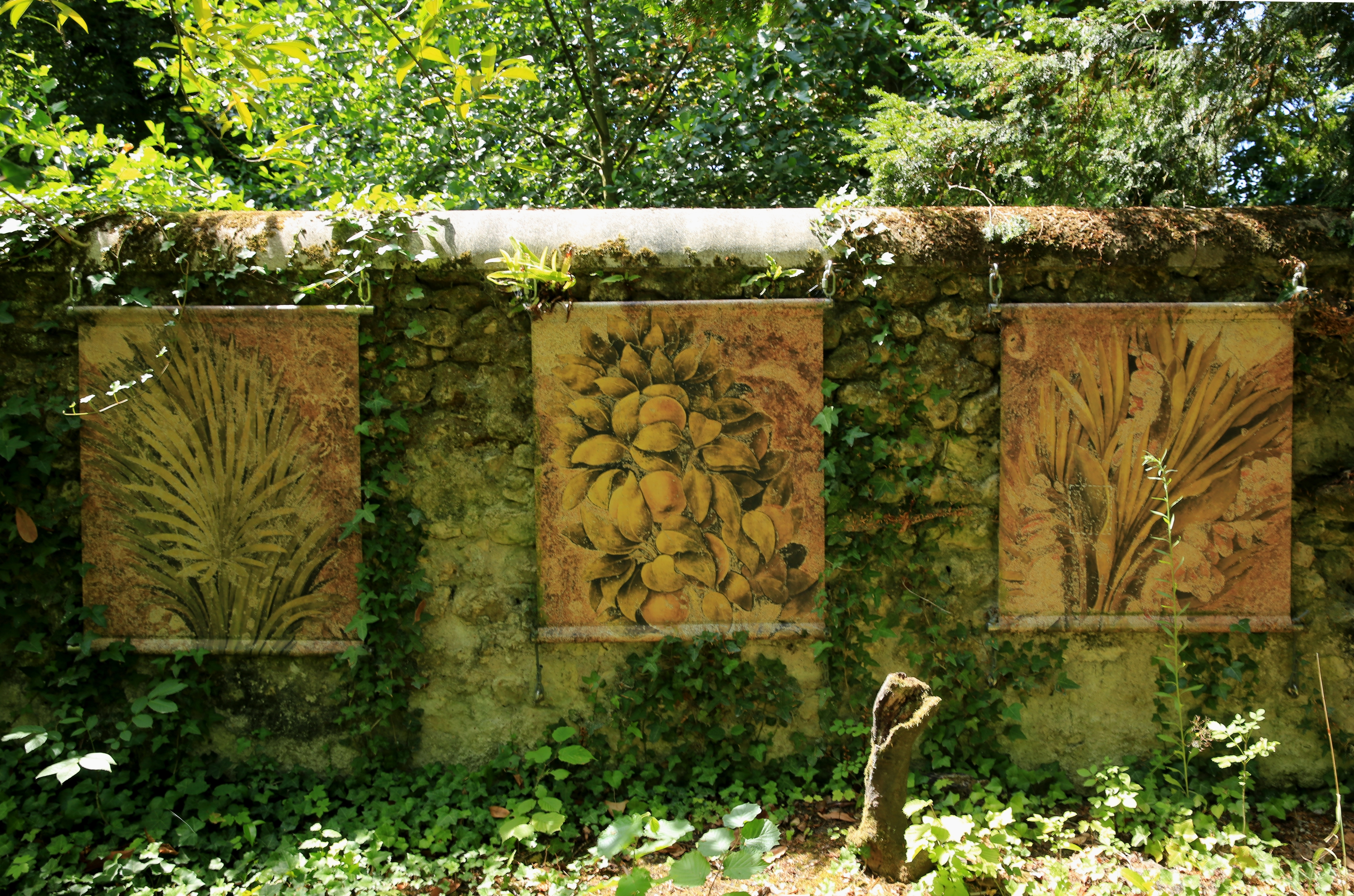
The botanical garden

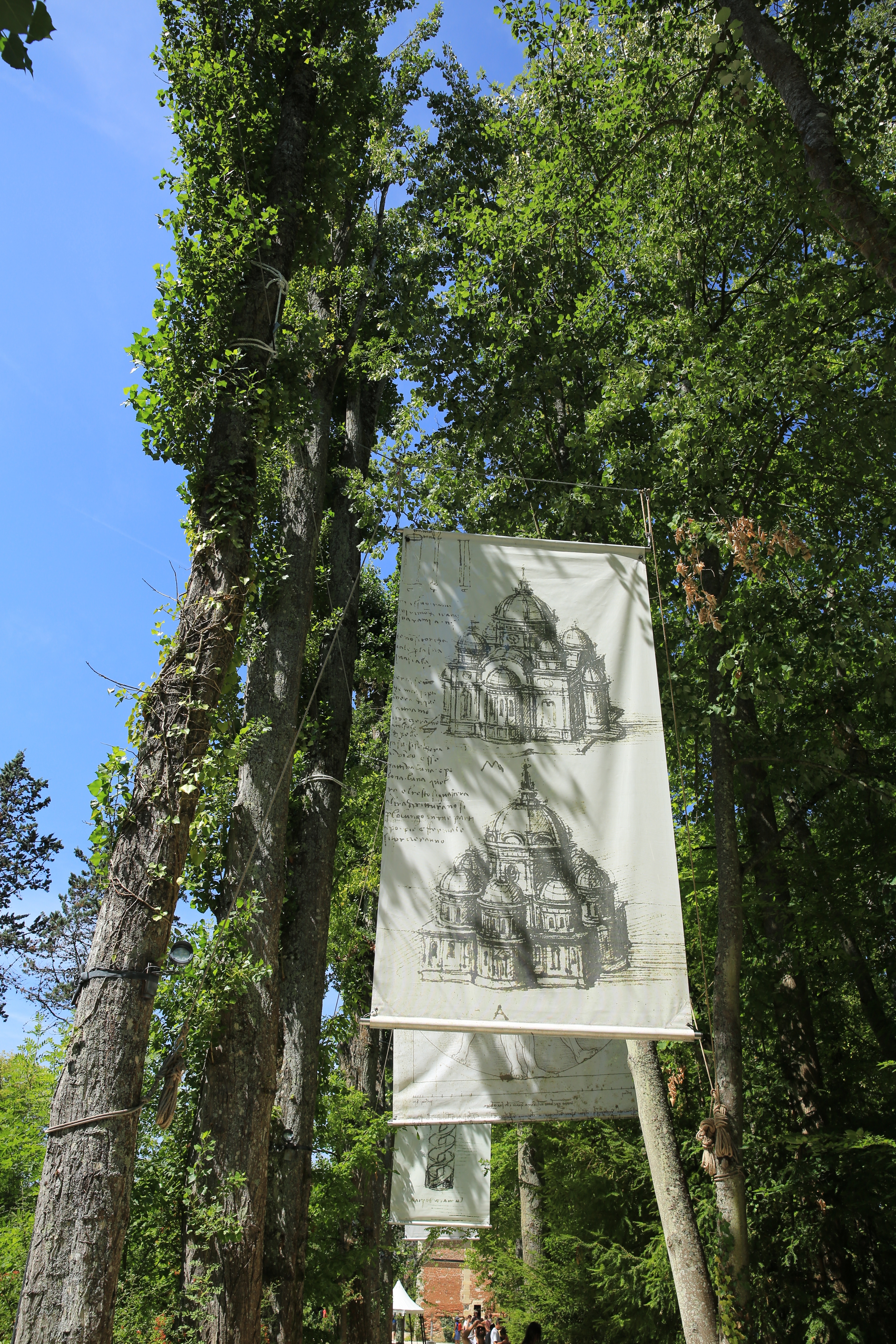
Exhibitions of drawings by Leonardo in the garden

== See also ==
- Châteaux of the Loire Valley
- House of Amboise
