= Da Vinci family =

Italian family

- Florentine family
- Current region: Tuscany; Italy
- Origin: Florentine Republic; Vinci, Tuscany
- Founded: 1312; 714 years ago
- Founder: Michele Da Vinci
- Current head: Paolo Vinci (1935)
- Connected families: Buonfiglioli, Giulli, Cortigiani
- Estate: Casa Leonardo

The Da Vinci family is an Italian family originating from the town of Vinci, Tuscany, best known for producing the Renaissance polymath Leonardo da Vinci.

== Origins ==
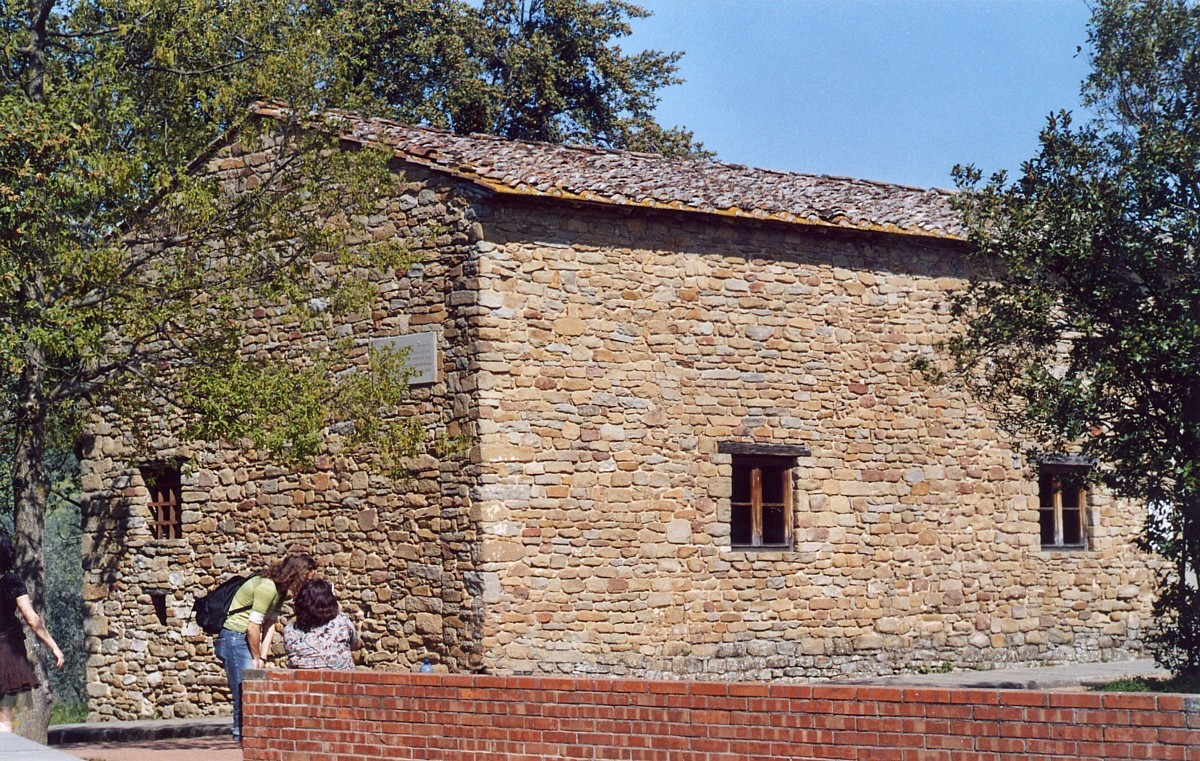
Casa Leonardo, the house where Leonardo da Vinci is believed to have grown up. It is situated alongside Via di Anchiano, 3 km north of Vinci, Tuscany, Italy

The name derives from Vinci, Tuscany, the place of origin of the family. Michele Da Vinci is considered to be the founder of the family. There is no evidence that Michele Da Vinci was a notary and no act stipulated by him is known. Michele Da Vinci probably was born in the 13th century or beginning of the 14th century. Michele Da Vinci probably died before 15 November 1331, as it emerges from a deed stipulated in November of that year in Vinci, by his son Guido, who was certainly born before 1331.

== History ==
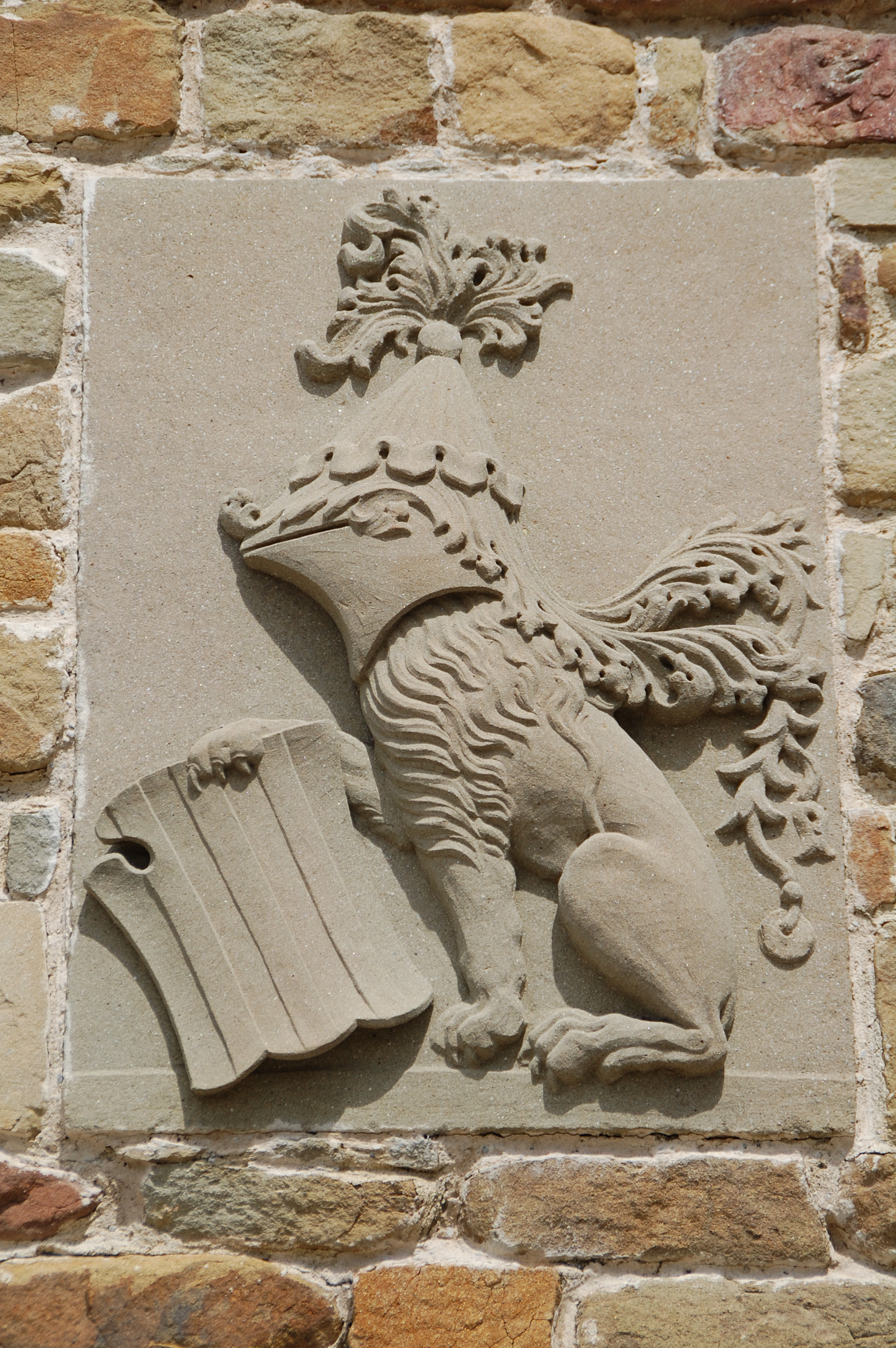
Coat of arms of the da Vinci family found on the childhood house of Leonardo da Vinci

Political map of Italy in the year in 1494.

Leonardo Da Vinci's grandfather Antonio and father Piero were notaries, and Antonio noted the birth of Leonardo in a notary book of the 14th century used as a collection of memories of the family, writing, "Nacque un mio nipote, figliolo di ser Piero mio figliolo a dì 15 aprile del 1452 in sabato a ore 3 di notte [according to the Gregorian calendar, the 23rd of April at 9:40 p.m.] Ebbe nome Lionardo." This notarial notebook originally belonged to Antonio's grandfather, Guido Da Vinci. The note continues: "Battizzollo prete Piero di Bartolomeo da Vinci, in presenza di Papino di Nanni, Meo di Tonino, Pier di Malvolto, Nanni di Venzo, Arigo di Giovanni Tedesco, monna Lisa di Domenico di Brettone, monna Antonia di Giuliano, monna Niccolosa del Barna, monna Maria, figlia di Nanni di Venzo, monna Pippa di Previcone". The register does not indicate Leonardo's place of birth, which is believed to be the house that Piero's family owned, together with a farm, in Anchiano, where Caterina Buonfiglioli (1436–1495), Leonardo's mother went to live. The house of Anchiano (see the picture) entered into the possessions of the Da Vinci family after the birth of Leonardo, thus he was not born there but in the village of Vinci and then he was with his mother near the church of San Pantaleo, now in ruins, outside Vinci.

Starting in the 17th century, the surname changed from Da Vinci to Vinci.

Film director Franco Zeffirelli was a descendant of Leonardo's father.

In 2021, fourteen living descendants of Leonardo da Vinci's father were found in Italy.

On 21 May 2025, the investigations into the Y chromosome of living descendants continue, with 6 living descendants having undergone DNA analysis; The investigations have confirmed that portions of the Y chromosome coincide with each other, thus confirming the genetic continuity of the male line of the Da Vinci family, at least starting from the 15th generation.

As of 2025, the family is 713 years old and the current head of the family is Paolo Vinci (born 1935).

== Family tree ==
Da Vinci family

Michele Da Vinci (n/a)
Guido Da Vinci (1331)
Giovanni Da Vinci (1357–1406)	Piero Da Vinci (1360–1417) great-grandfather of Leonardo da Vinci
Antonio Da Vinci (1393–1469) grandfather of Leonardo da Vinci
Margherita Giulli third wife of Piero Da Vinci	Piero Da Vinci (1426–1504) father of Leonardo da Vinci	Caterina Buonfiglioli (1436) mother of Leonardo da Vinci
Lucrezia Cortigiani fourth wife of Piero Da Vinci
Leonardo da Vinci (1452–1519)
Antonio Da Vinci (1476)	Maddalena Da Vinci (1477)	Giuliano Da Vinci (1479)	Lorenzo Da Vinci (1484)	Violante Da Vinci (1485)	Domenico Da Vinci (1486)
Margherita Da Vinci (1491)	Benedetto Da Vinci (1492)	Pandolfo Da Vinci (1494)	Guglielmo; Da Vinci (1496)	Bartolomeo; Da Vinci (1497)	Giovanni; Da Vinci (1498)
Marietta Bonaccorsi wife of Guglielmo Da Vinci	Margherita wife of Bartolomeo Da Vinci
Pier Francesco Da Vinci; Pierino nephew of Leonardo Da Vinci (1530–1554)
Clemenza Da Vinci (–1565)	Benedetto Da Vinci (1553)	Alessandro Da Vinci (1553)

== Notable members ==
- Michele da Vinci, the founder of the family, great-great-great grandfather of Leonardo da Vinci.
- Guido da Vinci (1331), great-great-grandfather of Leonardo da Vinci.
- Piero da Vinci (1360–1417), great-grandfather of Leonardo da Vinci.
- Antonio da Vinci (1393–1469), grandfather of Leonardo da Vinci.
- Piero da Vinci (1426–1504), father of Leonardo da Vinci.
- Leonardo da Vinci (1452–1519), Italian polymath of the High Renaissance.
- Giuliano da Vinci (1478–1525), son of Piero da Vinci.
- Lorenzo da Vinci (1484), son of Piero da Vinci.
- Domenico da Vinci (1486–1563), son of Piero da Vinci, the progenitor of the living descendants.
- Pierino da Vinci (1530–1553), Italian sculptor, nephew of Leonardo da Vinci.

== See also ==
- Museo leonardiano di Vinci
- Museo Ideale Leonardo da Vinci
- Museo Nazionale Scienza e Tecnologia Leonardo da Vinci
- Florentine Republic
- Medici

== Bibliography ==
- R. Bianchi, Vinci, Leonardo e la sua famiglia (con appendice di documenti inediti), Milano, Industrie Grafiche Italiane Stucchi, s.d. (1952).
- Anonimo, L'abitazione della famiglia di Leonardo a Firenze, in Raccolta Vinciana, IX, 1913–17.
- G. Uzielli, Ricerche intorno a Leonardo da Vinci, G. Pellas, Firenze, 1872.
- F. Moeller, Ser Giuliano di ser Piero da Vinci e le sue relazioni con Leonardo, in Rivista d'Arte, XVI, 1934.
- R. Casarosa e Alessandro Guidotti, Notariato e storia delle arti a Firenze nel Medioevo, in Il notaio nella civiltà fiorentina, Vallecchi, Firenze, 1984, scheda 278 (A. Guidotti).
- Milena Magnano, Leonardo, collana I Geni dell'arte, Mondadori Arte, Milano 2007. ISBN 978-88-370-6432-7
- Angelo Paratico, "Leonardo Da Vinci. A Chinese Scholar Lost in Renaissance Italy" Lascar Publishing, 2015.
- Angelo Paratico, "Leonardo Da Vinci. Lo psicopatico figlio di una schiava" Gingko Edizioni, 2021.
