= Da Vinci (disambiguation) =

Leonardo da Vinci (1452–1519) was an Italian Renaissance polymath.

Da Vinci or variant, may also refer to:

== People ==
=== People with the surname ===
- Da Vinci family, an Italian family
- Pierino da Vinci (c. 1529-1553/54), sculptor, Leonardo's nephew

=== Fictional characters ===
- Dominic Da Vinci, titular character from Da Vinci's Inquest

=== Nicknames ===
- Dmytro Kotsiubailo (1995–2023; nom-de-guerre; Da Vinci), Ukrainian volunteer fighter, commander of the Da Vinci Wolves battalion.

=== Stage name ===
- Paul Da Vinci (born 1951), stage name of English pop singer Paul Prewer
- Sal Da Vinci (born 1969), stage name of Italian singer Salvatore Michael Sorrentino

== Places ==
- Da Vinci (lunar crater)
- Da Vinci (Martian crater)

== Technology ==
- Da Vinci Surgical System, a robotic surgery system
- da Vinci Systems, a color correction company (liquidated in 2009 and assets acquired by Blackmagic Design)
  - DaVinci Resolve, video editing software originally authored by da Vinci Systems and developed by Blackmagic Design
- da Vinci Project, a planned suborbital crewed spacecraft
- Texas Instruments DaVinci, a system-on-a-chip for digital video
- Da Vinci Machine, a project to add dynamic language support to the Java Virtual Machine
- DaVinci (software), a development tool used to create HTML5 mobile applications and media content
- DAVINCI, a planned NASA mission that will send an atmospheric probe to Venus

== Music ==
- Da Vinci (band), a Portuguese pop rock band
- "Da Vinci" (song), a song by Weezer

== Other uses ==
- Da Vinci (restaurant), a restaurant in Maasbracht, Netherlands
- GTS Da Vinci, a cruise ship owned by Club Cruise
- DaVinci Academy of Science and the Arts, a charter school in Ogden, Utah
- Da Vinci Tower, a proposed building in Dubai, United Arab Emirates
- Da Vinci (magazine), magazine about books published in Japan
- Da Vinki, phrase popularized by the Voros Twins
- Da Vinci Capital is a company that manages private equity funds. It was founded in 2007 by Oleg Jelesko

== See also ==
- List of things named after Leonardo da Vinci
- Cycles Devinci, makers of Devinci bicycles
- The Da Vinci Code (disambiguation), the novel by Dan Brown and related items
- Leonardo da Vinci (disambiguation)
- Vinci (disambiguation)
