= Vinci =

Vinci may refer to:

== Places ==
- Vinci, Tuscany, a comune in the province of Florence, Italy
- Vinci (Golubac), a community in Braničevo District, Serbia

== People ==
- Alessandro Vinci (born 1987), Italian footballer
- Alessio Vinci (born 1968), Italian journalist
- Carlo Vinci (1906–1993), American animator
- Charles Vinci (1933–2018), American weightlifter
- Giovanni Vinci (born 1990), Italian professional wrestler
- Leonardo Vinci (1690–1730), Italian composer
- Leonardo da Vinci (1452–1519), Italian polymath
- Pietro Vinci (fl. 1525–1584), Italian composer
- Roberta Vinci (born 1983), Italian tennis player
- Sarah Vinci (born 1991), Australian wheelchair basketball player
- Sonia Vinci (born 1971), Australian journalist
- Vinci, stage name of Vincy Chan (born 1982), Hong Kong singer
- Vinci Montaner (born 1976), Filipino singer

== Arts and entertainment ==
- Vinci (board game), a French board game
- Vinci (film), a 2004 Polish movie
- Vinci (play), a 2002 play by Canadian playwright Maureen Hunter
- Vinci (Rise of Legends), a civilization in the American computer game Rise of Nations: Rise of Legends

== Other uses ==
- Benelli Vinci, a semi-automatic shotgun
- Vinci (automobile), a Portuguese car
- Vinci SA, a French company that specialises in concessions and construction
- Vinci (rocket engine), a European rocket engine

== See also ==
- Da Vinci (disambiguation)
- Vincy (disambiguation)
