= Alessandro Vezzosi =

Italian art critic

Alessandro Vezzosi is an Italian art critic, Leonardo scholar, artist, expert on interdisciplinary studies and creative museology, he is also the author of hundreds of exhibits, publications and conferences, in Italy and abroad (from the United States to Japan) on Leonardo da Vinci and the Renaissance, contemporary art and design. Amongst others, he was the first scholar from the Armand Hammer Centre for Leonardo Studies from the University of California in Los Angeles (1981), directed by Carlo Pedretti; he taught at the University of Progetto in Reggio Emilia; and he is honorary professor at the Accademia delle Arti del Disegno of Florence. He began as an artist from 1964 to 1971 winning more than 80 prizes in painting competitions. In the Seventies he was the founder of the "Archivio Leonardisimi" and of Strumenti-Memoria del Territorio; he coordinated "ArteCronaca", he was the historical-artistic consultant of the Municipality of Vinci and he collaborated on the publications on Tuscany and Leonardo, modern and contemporary art. In 1980 he curated the Centro di Documentazione Arti Visive of the Municipality of Florence (with Maurizio Nannucci).

He is the founder and director of the Museo Ideale Leonardo da Vinci with the nascent "Garden of Leonardo and of Utopia" at Vinci, near Florence.

In 2005 in Museo Ideale Leonardo da Vinci presented the discovery of professor James Beck a marble self-portrait of Michelangelo Buonarroti.

In 2011 presents together with Claudio Strinati in Caprese Michelangelo the marble self-portrait of Michelangelo Buonarroti which was published in "Michelangelo Assoluto" by Scripta Maneant.

== Published works ==
The published works of Alessandro Vezzosi, from 1980, include:

- Alessandro Vezzosi (1981). Leonardo's return to Vinci-Leonardo, Poussin, Rubens. Introduction by Carlo Pedretti. Exhibition displayed at American Museums, from Berkeley (University Art Museum) to Princeton. New York: Johnson Reprint Corporation.
- Alessandro Vezzosi (ed.), (1986). Il giardino d'Europa: Pratolino come modello nella cultura europea. Milano : Mazzotta.
- ——— , (1987). Leonardo: art utopia and science = Leonardo: arte utopia e scienza. Firenze: Giunti Barbèra.
- ——— , (1988). Leonardo: scomparso e ritrovato. Florence: Giunti.
- ——— , (1993). Il tesoro dell'architettura. Cleto Munari (1980-1990) = The treasure of architecture. Cleto Munari (1980-1990). Florence: Edifir.
- ——— , (1995). cd-rom Leonardo. La Pittura. Florence: SCALA-EMME (translated in French, German, English).
- ——— , (1996). Leonardo da Vinci: arte e scienza dell'universo, collection "Universale Electa/Gallimard" (n° 73). Trieste: Electa/Gallimard. ISBN 9788844500832.
- ——— , (1996 and reprints). Léonard de Vinci : Art et science de l'univers, collection "Découvertes Gallimard" (n° 293). Paris: Gallimard. ISBN 9782070348800.
- ——— , (1997 and reprints). Leonardo da Vinci: Renaissance man, New Horizons series. London: Thames & Hudson. ISBN 050030081X.
- ——— , (1997). Leonardo da Vinci: The Mind of the Renaissance, Abrams Discoveries series. New York: Harry N. Abrams. ISBN 9780810928091.
- Alessandro Vezzosi (ed.) (2006). Leonardo, mito e verità: riscoperte, attualità e nodi della conoscenza. Vinci: Museo Ideale Leonardo da Vinci.
- ——— , (2008). Leonardo Infinito. Reggio Emilia: Scripta Maneant.
- ——— ,(2009) Joconde. Da Monnalisa alla Gioconda nuda. Museo Ideale Leonardo da Vinci. Edizione ADARTE.
- Alessandro Vezzosi,(2010) La Gioconda è Nuda. Riscoperte e nuove icone a cura di Agnese Sabato. Ed. JFK Edizioni. ISBN 978-88-89965-80-1
- Claudio Strinati, Alessandro Vezzosi, (2010). Raffaello Universale. Reggio Emilia: Scripta Maneant.
- Alessandro Vezzosi (ed.) (2011). Leonardo e l'idea della bellezza = Leonardo and the idea of beauty. Tokyo: Mainichi Shinbunsha.
- Alessandro Vezzosi, (2011). Mona Lisa Unveiled. RSM: JFK Edizioni. ISBN 978-88-89477-41-0
- Alessandro Vezzosi,(2012) La forza di un’idea visiva. Archivio Leonardismi. Vinci.
- Alessandro Vezzosi (ed.), (2012). Michelangelo Assoluto. Reggio Emilia: Scripta Maneant.
- ——— ,(2013) Vinci e Leonardo n.6 novembre-dicembre. Ed. Strumenti – Memoria del Territorio. Vinci.
- Alessandro Vezzosi e Agnese Sabato (a cura di) (2013) La Gioconda è Nuda. Ed. Strumenti Memoria del Territorio. ISBN 978-88-902625-4-8
- Alessandro Vezzosi (ed.), (2013). Leonardo-Mona Lisa-The myth, Taipei: Mediasphere.
