= Leonardo da Vinci (disambiguation) =

Leonardo da Vinci (1452–1519) was an Italian Renaissance polymath.

Leonardo da Vinci may also refer to:

- Leonardo da Vinci (Stanley book), 1996
- Leonardo da Vinci (Isaacson book), 2017
- Leonardo da Vinci (video game), a 1997 educational game
- SS Leonardo da Vinci (1924), an ocean liner of the Società di Navigazione Transatlantica Italiana
- SS Leonardo da Vinci (1958), an ocean liner of the Italian Line, built as a replacement for the Andrea Doria
- Italian submarine Leonardo da Vinci (1939), launched in 1939
- Italian submarine Leonardo da Vinci (S 510), commissioned in the Italian Navy in 1955
- Italian battleship Leonardo da Vinci
- Leonardo da Vinci programme, a European Commission funding programme
- Leonardo da Vinci–Fiumicino Airport
- Leonardo da Vinci: The Mind of the Renaissance, a 1996 illustrated book by Alessandro Vezzosi

== See also ==
- List of things named after Leonardo da Vinci
- Da Vinci (disambiguation)
- Leonardo Vinci (1690–1730), Italian composer best known for his operas
- Leonardo DiCaprio (born 1974), American actor
