= Museo Ideale Leonardo da Vinci =

Museum dedicated to Leonardo da Vinci

Coordinates: 43°47′15.32″N 10°55′36.2″E

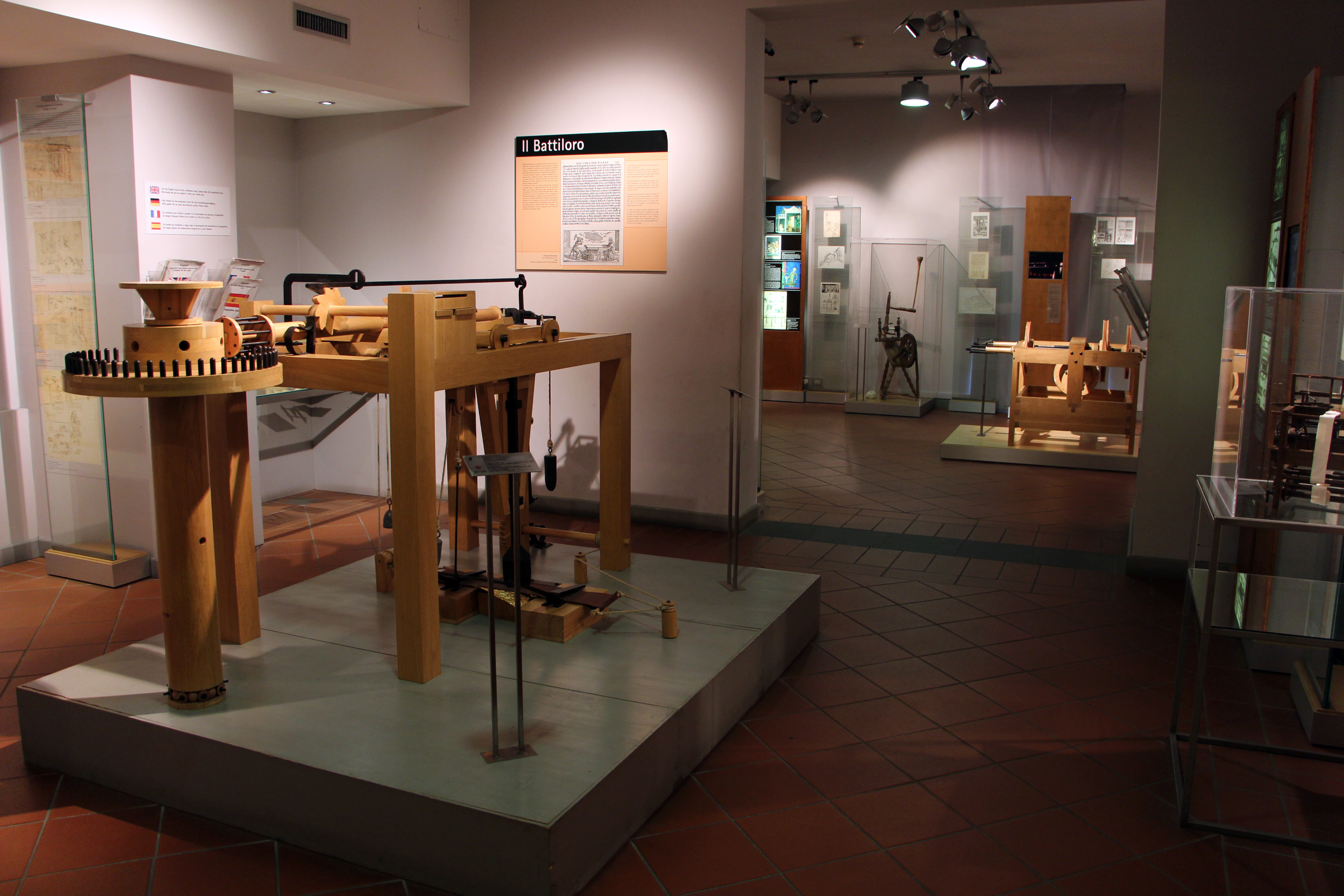
The museum houses a large collection of models constructed on the basis of Leonardo's drawings.

The Museo Ideale Leonardo da Vinci is located in Vinci, Leonardo da Vinci's birthplace, in the province of Florence, Italy. It is part of the Museo leonardiano di Vinci.

== History ==
The museum was inaugurated on October 2, 1993, under the patronage of the Regione Toscana, Provincia di Firenze, and the Municipality of Vinci. Support was provided by the Armand Hammer Center for Leonardo Studies (University of California at Los Angeles) and Raccolta Vinciana.

The museum director is Alessandro Vezzosi and the President of the International Association is Agnese Sabato. Carlo Pedretti was the honorary president until his death on January 5, 2018.

The museum was founded by scholars and artists as the first museum dedicated to Leonardo da Vinci. His works as an artist, scientist, inventor, and designer are explored through the theory of the Imaginary Museum.

The museum has developed exhibitions such as:

- Leonardo Art, Science and Utopia in Toronto in 1987
- Leonardo Disappeared and Found in Florence in 1988
- Leonardo News and Myth in Rome, 1989 and in Budapest, in 1991

It also created the first CD-Rom dedicated to Leonardo, Leonardo: The Digital Painting (ACTA, 1989).

== Guidelines ==
The Museo Ideale Leonardo da Vinci presents research, philological inquiry and creativity. The three main objectives of the museum are:

- Dissemination of knowledge about the true Leonardo, beyond the stereotypes, rhetoric, and legend.
- Reporting the results of new studies and interpretations on Leonardo and also his school and influence.
- Reporting new interpretations of his work that take into account both the social and cultural context of the Renaissance.

== Location ==
The museum is located within the Conti Guidi castle in Vinci, in the province of Florence, Italy. In 1868, as recorded by Giuseppi Garabaldi, ownership of the castle was shared with the counts of Masetti da Bagnano and the counts Guidi. Opposite the museum entrance is the former location of a mill (with a millpond) that was operated by Leonardo's father Ser Piero and his uncle Francesco, beginning in 1478. The nineteenth-century portion of the building was built on the foundations of the millpond owned by the city and by the da Vinci family.

Due to rainwater leaking into the exhibition areas from the overlying building, the museum was temporarily closed and was planned to reopen in 2019.

== Collections ==
Started in 1972, the collection contains a variety of items pertaining to the city of Vinci. It was designed to assemble a variety of artwork, artifacts, and documents relevant to the museum's mission.

The collection includes original antique paintings, tools, and instruments from Leonardo's time and native land. Objects in the collection include models based on his projects, relevant memorabilia, and thousands of artifacts, including Knots by Albrecht Dürer and the Dome of Arts and Ideas by Buckminster Fuller, both of which are inspired by Leonardo.

== Archives ==
=== The Leonardeschi ===
The Museo Ideale traces its origins to the 1993 exhibition, Leonardo and Leonardism in Naples and Rome. Modeled after the Capodimonte Museum and Palazzo Barberini, the museum is dedicated to researching and cataloguing works by Leonardo's collaborators, students and followers, in order to highlight characteristics of da Vinci's studio, as well as the extension of his influence in various Italian and European regions.

The aim is to represent and compare a growing number of works by Leonardeschi artists via scientific examination and iconographic analysis, in order to attribute works.

=== Leonardisms ===
The museum also aims to collect all the quotes, derivations, uses and misuses of images of Leonardo, from art to mass media, from the 16th century to the present. This is a collection in progress, started in 1972, that includes thousands of original artworks and artifacts, reproductions and documentary materials from around the world, from Old Master engravings to Marcel Duchamp, bookplates and stamps, memorabilia from the nineteenth-century cinema, and advertising.

=== Leonardo's fingerprints ===
Following the discovery of fingerprints in Leonardo's paintings and manuscripts, the Museo Ideale has been working systematically on the topic of Leonardo's fingerprints. This research is far from reaching definitive conclusions and is subject to misunderstanding and falsification. With the collaborative and interdisciplinary advice of other institutions conducting scholarly investigations, the museum aims to identify and reconstruct Leonardo's fingerprints and to contribute to anthropological knowledge of the artist and his works, which has been often executed not only with the brush, but with the use of his bare fingers, too.

=== Museo Ideale of the Renaissance ===
The museum has begun external activities by curating exhibitions and publications:

- Raphael and the Idea of Beauty and Raphael Lives (Rome 2001)
- The School of the World: Leonardo and Michelangelo (Vinci 2004)
- Leonardo, Michelangelo, Raphael (Gothenburg 2011 and Istanbul 2012)
- Books: Raffaello Universale (2010) and Michelangelo Assoluto (2012).

== The Garden of Leonardo and Utopia ==
The creation of the Garden of Leonardo and Utopia, located just outside Vinci, was created as the outdoor section of the Museo Ideale. It was initiated as a project of the "village of creativity" and as a theme park called "Center of art-nature – science for the Tuscany of Leonardo". Currently, the garden is awaiting approval for its reopening.

The Labyrinth of Leonardo was constructed in 1997 as an artwork based on drawings by Leonardo. The first piece was designed with sunflowers, while the second was a 60-metre-diameter (200 ft) labyrinth created with 1,500 trees of vinci (purple willow), forming 740 metres (2,430 ft) of pathways. In 1999, the garden was reinvented again, with its spiral shape continuously growing, inspired by the "Avenue" by Bruno Munari. Plants in the garden include the laurel tree of President Azeglio Ciampi, and other plants chosen by artists, scientists, poets, authorities, and supporters of the museum.

== Activities ==
Multimedia produced by the museum include the Leonardo da Vinci e il Codice Hammer: exhibition and CD-ROM (1994); Leonardo. La pittura, ACTA-EMME, (1995); La Biblioteca ideale di Leonardo, (1999); I Parchi di ingegni e meraviglie in Toscana. Da Leonardo e Buontalenti al terzo millennio for Regione Toscana, (2007); Itinerario leonardiano per l'IMSS, (2008).

Publications and traveling exhibitions in Italy and abroad include: conferences, educational projects for schools, work in progress with artists, research studies and presentations (Sulle tracce di Leonardo, Leonardo cinquecento anni dopo, Vinci e Leonardo, La Toscana nell'arte del XX secolo, Capolavori del mito, Processi al mito di Leonardo, Il Codice da Vinci di Dan Brown: vero/falso, etc). One of the museum's projects was to exhibit the Codex Leicester (bought by Bill Gates) and the Tavola Doria, a copy of Leonardo's lost Battle of Anghiari fresco.

In April 2016, living descendants of Leonardo da Vinci and a new genealogical tree of the da Vinci family were discovered after decades of research. This was presented in the Teatro di Vinci.

External exhibitions organized by the museum include:

- Leonardo's bridges (Malmö and Stockholm, 1993, with the Lady with an Ermine)
- Leonardo. Le favole e il mare (Sestri Levante, 1996)
- Leonardo. Dal Mediterraneo alla luna (Cagliari and Alghero, 1997)
- Il Giardino dell'utopia da Leonardo a Pratolino (1999)
- Leonardo and Europe (Assisi, Naples, Rome, Biel-Bienne, 2000–2001)
- Léonard. L'artist de la science (Strasburg, 2002)
- Leonardo. I giochi e lo sport (Athens, 2004; Florence, 2005)
- Leonardo and the Codex Leicester (Tokyo, 2005)
- Leonardo. I segreti della creazione nell'arte e nella scienza (Athens, 2006)
- La Joconde inattendue (Clos-Lucé-Amboise, 2007)
- Leonardo a Firenze (2008)
- AND THERE WAS LIGHT, Michelangelo, Leonardo, Raphael. The Masters of Renaissance, seen in a New Light (Gothenborg, 2010)
- Leonardo a Piombino (2011)
- La Gioconda è nuda (Brindisi, 2011)
- Mona Lisa Unveiled (Miami, 2011)
- Leonardo and the idea of beauty (Shizuoka, Fukuoka, Tokyo, with the Scapiliata, 2011–2012)
- The great masters. Michelangelo, Raphael, Leonardo (Istanbul, 2012)
- Leonardo-Mona Lisa-The Myths (Kaohsiung, 2013; Taipei 2013–2014)
- Leonardo Da Vinci. Beyond the visible (Edo Tokyo Museum, 2016)
- Da Clos Lucé al Louvre, i tre capolavori di Leonardo Da Vinci (Du Clos Lucé au Louvre, les trois chefs-d'œuvre de Léonard de Vinci, in collaboration with the Centre de Rècherche et de Restauration des Musées de France - C2RMF)

== See also ==
- Leonardo3 Museum
- Museo Nazionale Scienza e Tecnologia Leonardo da Vinci (Milan)

== Bibliography ==
- Il Museo Astronave, Vinci, November 1993
- S. Landi, A proposito del Museo Ideale Leonardo da Vinci in Ossimori, magazine of Anthropology and Human sciences, 1994
- I musei etnografici del territorio fiorentino, curated by P. Calosi, G. Cherubini, Z. Giuffoletti, C. Poni, L. Rombai, Provincia di Firenze, 1994
- Università La Sapienza di Roma. Facoltà di Sociologia a.a. 1995/1996 Mundaneum. Analysis on the organization of the Museo Ideale Leonardo Da Vinci
- A. Vezzosi, Leonardo da Vinci: arte e scienza dell'universo (coll. «Universale Electa/Gallimard» [nº 73]; first edition by Electa/Gallimard in 1996, coedition in 14 languages and countries); e-book Léonard de Vinci : Art et science de l'univers, coll. « Découvertes Gallimard » [nº 293], app. Gallimard (Paris, 2013) and coedition in Japanese (Sogensha) and Korean (Sigongsa).
- Carlo Pedretti, in Il Sole 24 ore, 2.XI.1997.
- Image and Science, XIV, CNRS, Paris, 1997.
- Vinci e Leonardo, magazine edited by the Museo Ideale (since 1997).
- Valerio Dehò, A. Vezzosi, Leonardo in azione e poesia, Vinci, MILDV, 2001.
- A. Sabato - A.Vezzosi (edited by), Il museo ideale Leonardo da Vinci, guide, Vinci, 2002.
- A. Vezzosi, In viaggio con Leonardo. Invenzioni e macchine di un genio umanissimo, Vinci, MILDV, 2003.
- A. Sabato, Il Museo Ideale Leonardo da Vinci, in Amici dei Musei, anno XXX, N.98, April–June 2004.
- A. Sabato, A. Vezzosi, Leonardo: mito e verità : riscoperte, attualità e nodi della conoscenza, Vinci, MILDV, 2006.
- C. Pedretti, Così celebre e così incompresa and A. Vezzosi, Nuda alla metà, in «L'Osservatore Romano», 11-II-2011, p. 5.
- A. Vezzosi, Leonardo infinito, Reggio Emilia, Scripta Maneant, 2008.
- Naked Mona Lisa goes on show
- Mona Lisa nude painting
- La Gioconda è nuda / Mona Lisa Unveiled, FKR, San Marino, 2011.
