= Church of Santa Croce, Vinci =

Roman Catholic Church in Vinci, Tuscany

Coordinates: 43.7871°N 10.9268°E

The Church of Santa Croce is a Roman Catholic Church located in Vinci, Tuscany, Italy. Built in the 12th century, the church is known for being the location of the baptism of Leonardo da Vinci.

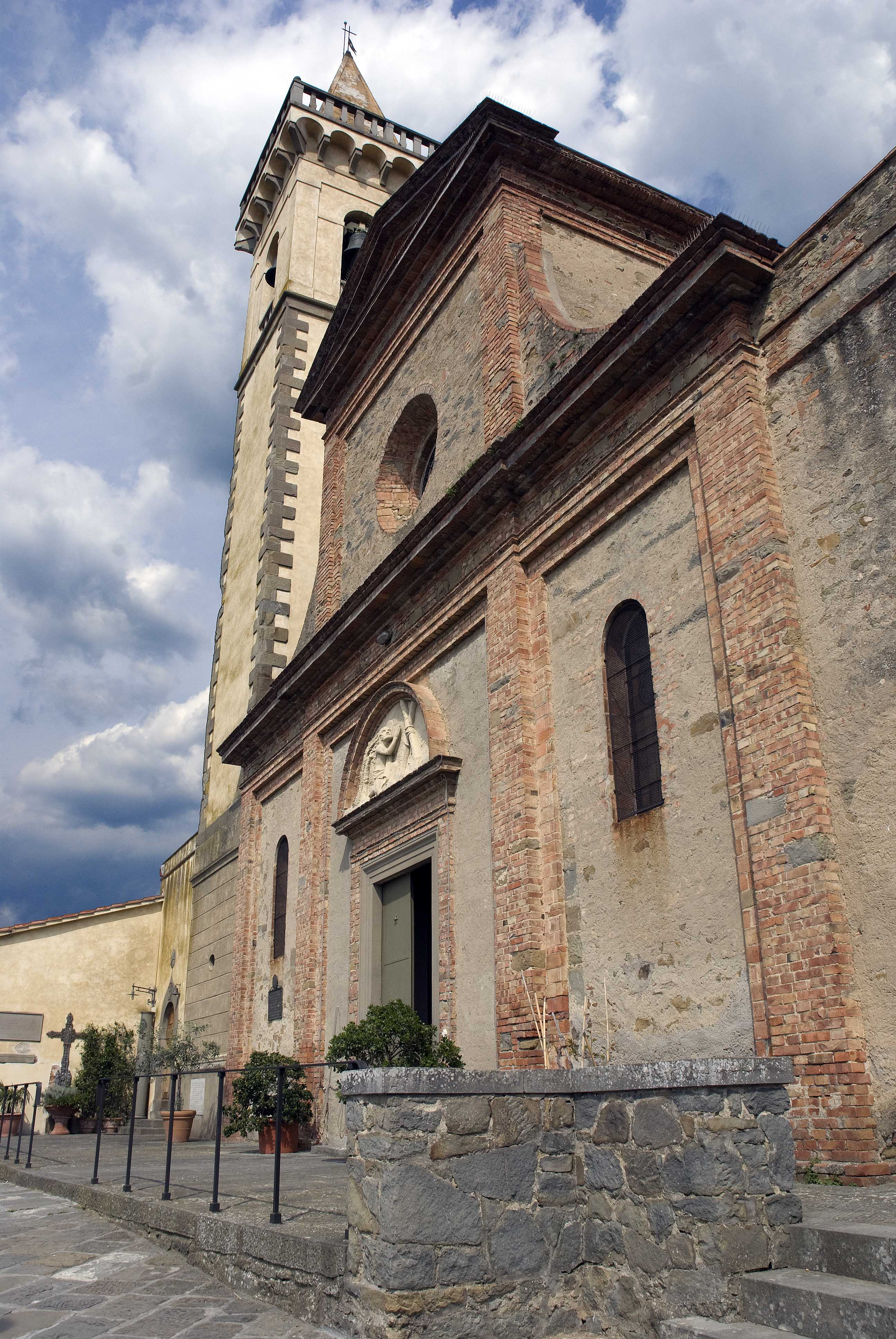
The façade

== History and description ==
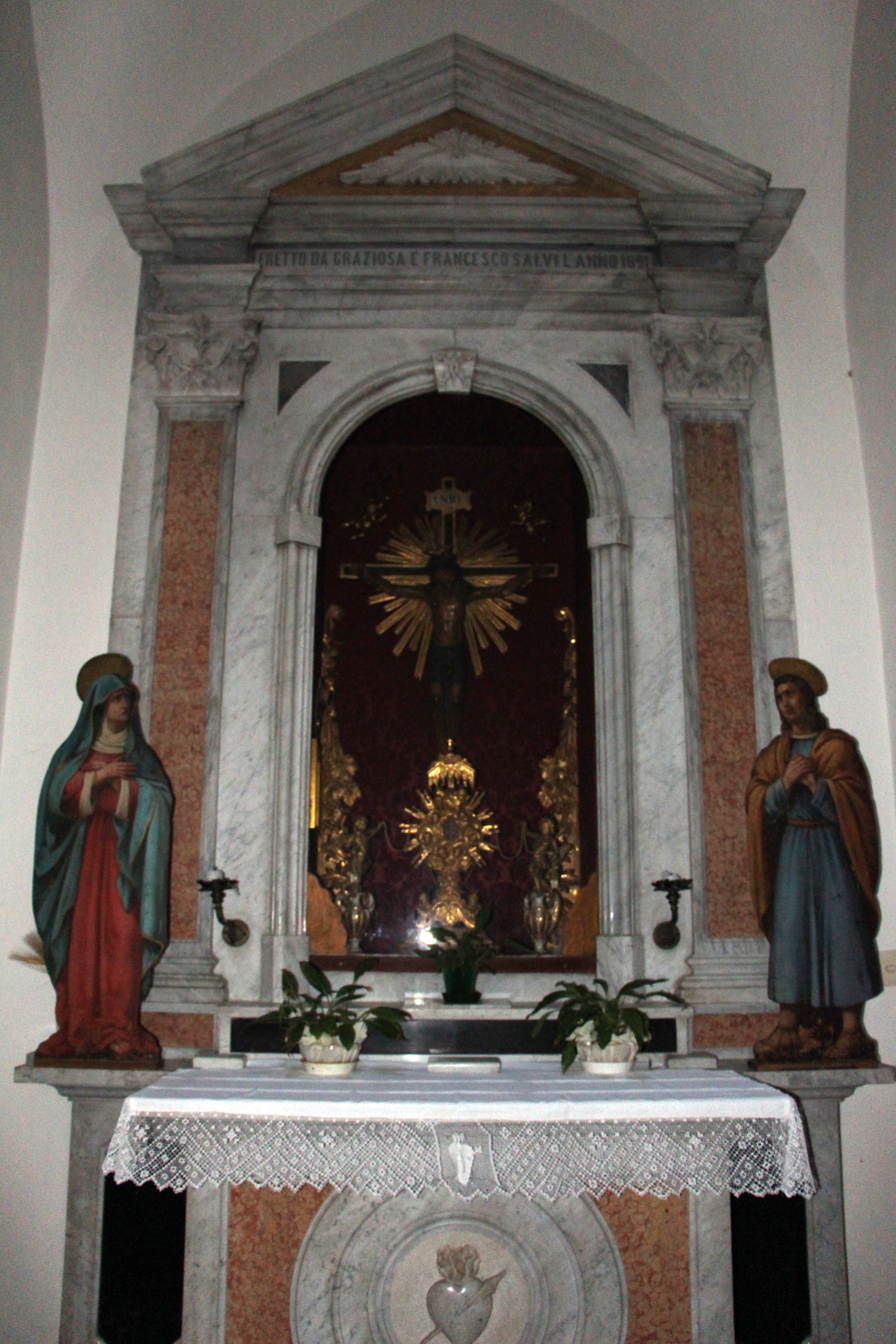
The chapel of the crucifixion

The church of Santa Croce was built in the 12th century and was redesigned and rebuilt multiple times. The church does not maintain its original form. The church was entirely reconstructed between 1925 and 1935, and was designed following a Renaissance Revival style.

The interior has three naves divided by several bays, at the end of which are two chapels, one dedicated to Sant’Andrea, and the other to the Blessed Sacrament. On the right there is the baptistery, which is one of the oldest parts of the church, and was restored in 1952, maintaining the original medieval font.

On the left there is the chapel of the crucifixion which houses an ancient wooden crucifix from the 14th century and a relic of the true cross. Notable paintings include the 16th-century Nativity of the Virgin by Francesco Brina (1562), the Virgin of the Rosary in the style of Matteo Rosselli (from the Badia Fiorentina), the Magdalene and the Most Holy Name of Mary by the Florentine school of the 17th–18th centuries, the Miracle of Saint Blaise attributed to Gaetano Piattoli (c. 1756, Alessandri altar) and an Adoration of the Magi by Pier Dandini (also from the Badia Fiorentina).

The church is part of the complex of the ancient Castello dei Conti Guidi, and thus it is rich in artefacts and of interest to local history.

== Baptistery ==
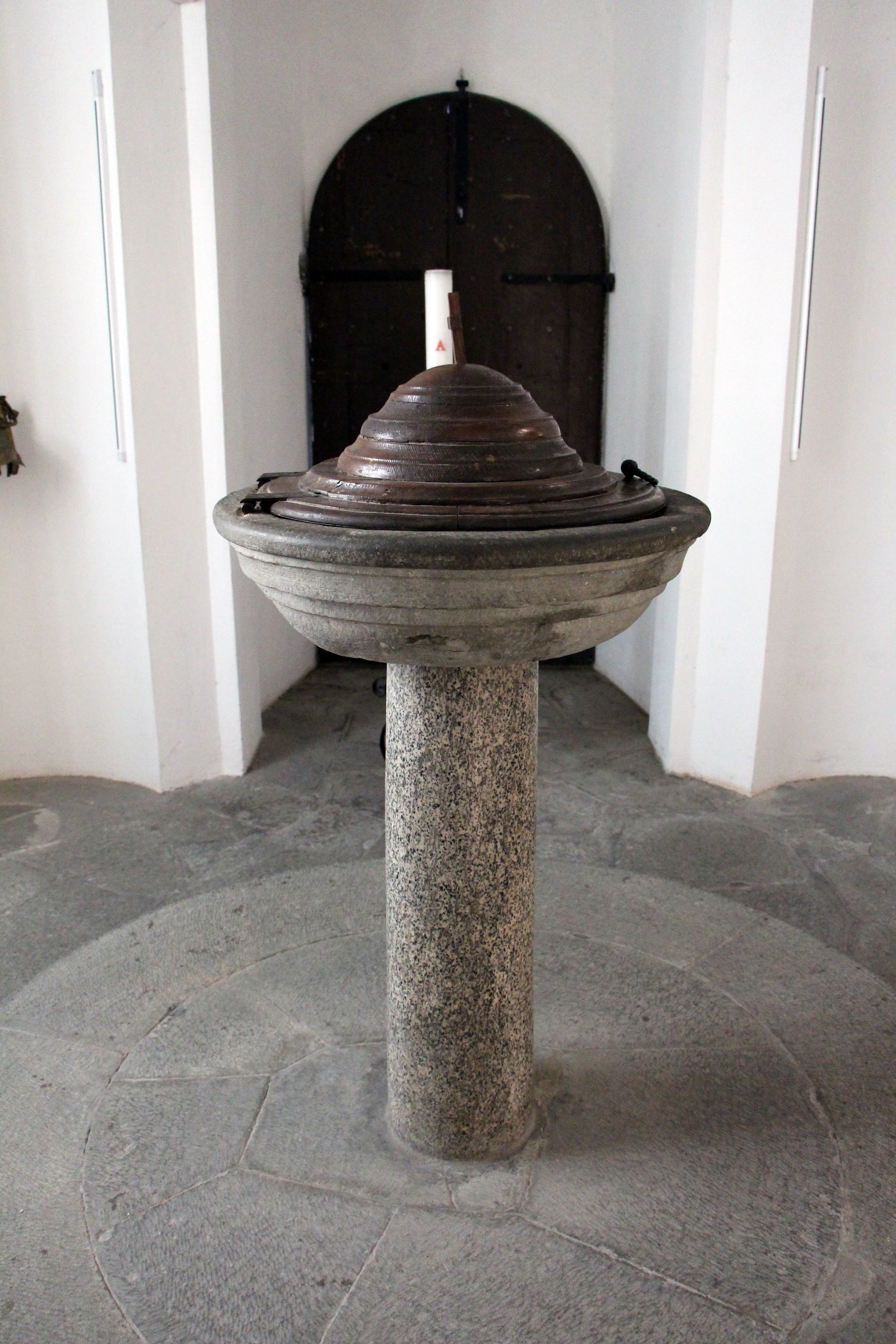
The baptismal font

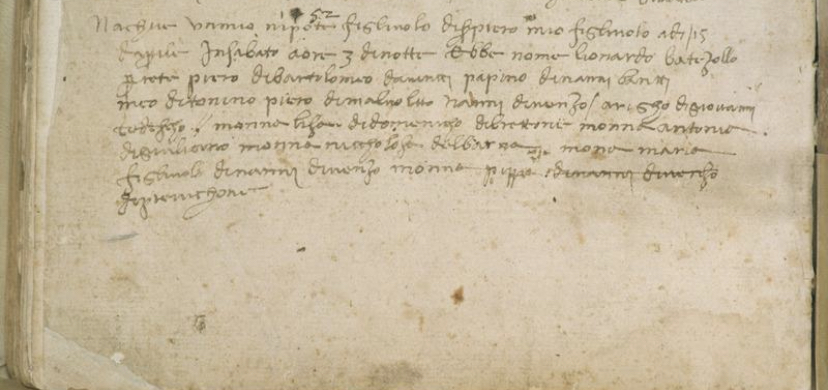
Da Vinci’s baptismal certificate

Housed within the premises of the Oratory of the Compagnia del Corpus Domini, it was inaugurated on 15 April 1952 during the celebrations marking the 500th anniversary of Leonardo da Vinci’s birth. At the centre of the octagonal room, designed by Ugo Giulio Arata, stands the ancient baptismal font, in which it is believed that on 16 April 1452 the parish priest Piero di Bartolomeo Cecci baptised Leonardo da Vinci. On the right-hand wall is a plaque commemorating both the place and date of Leonardo’s birth, taken from a document by his grandfather, Ser Antonio da Vinci. The room has also recently been enhanced by metal alloy sculptures created by the artist Cecco Bonanotte, inspired by the history of salvation.
