= Leonardo's crossbow =

Series of shooting weapon schematics by Leonardo da Vinci

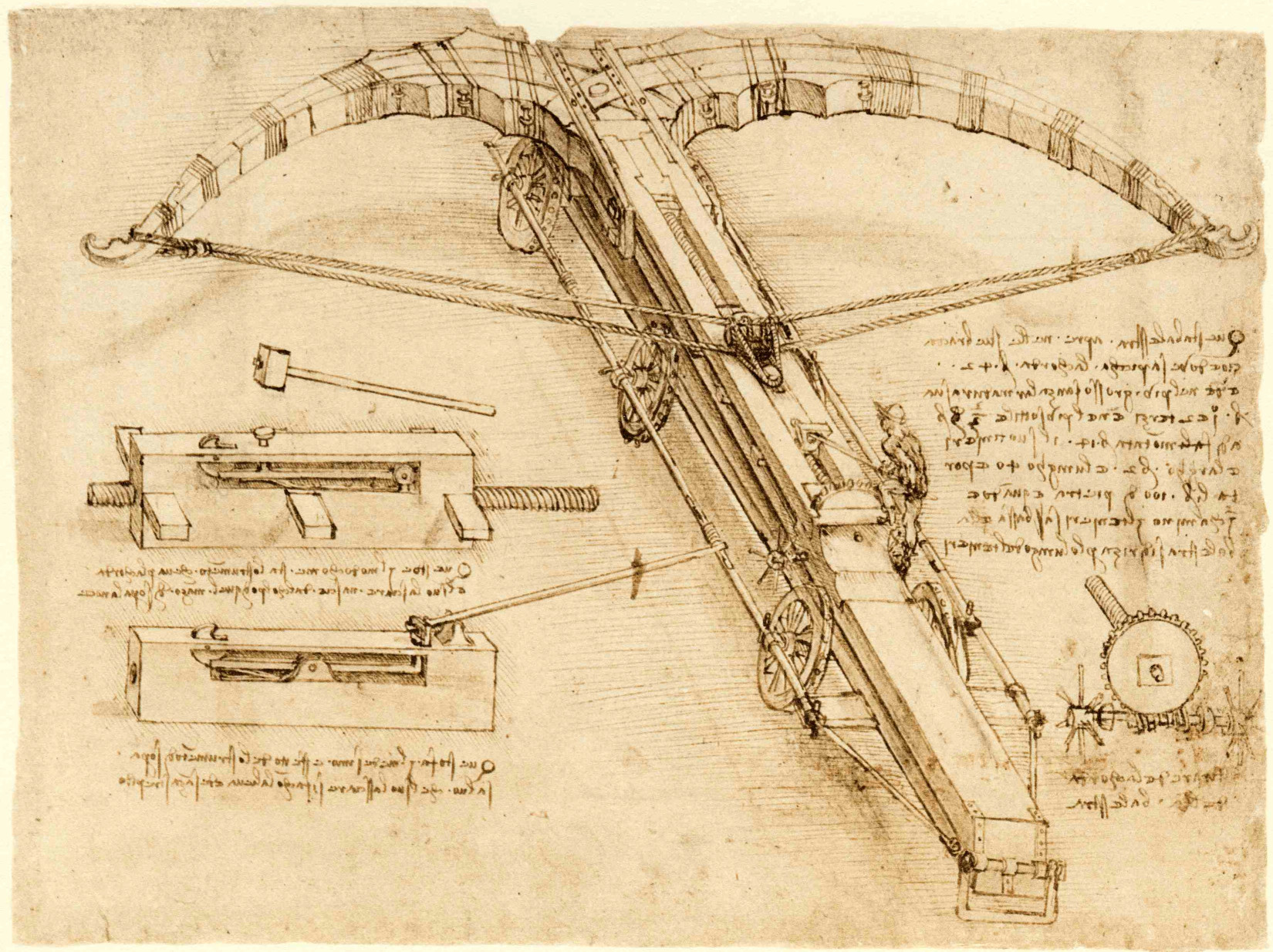
Drawing of a giant crossbow by Leonardo da Vinci on folio 149a of the Codex Atlanticus

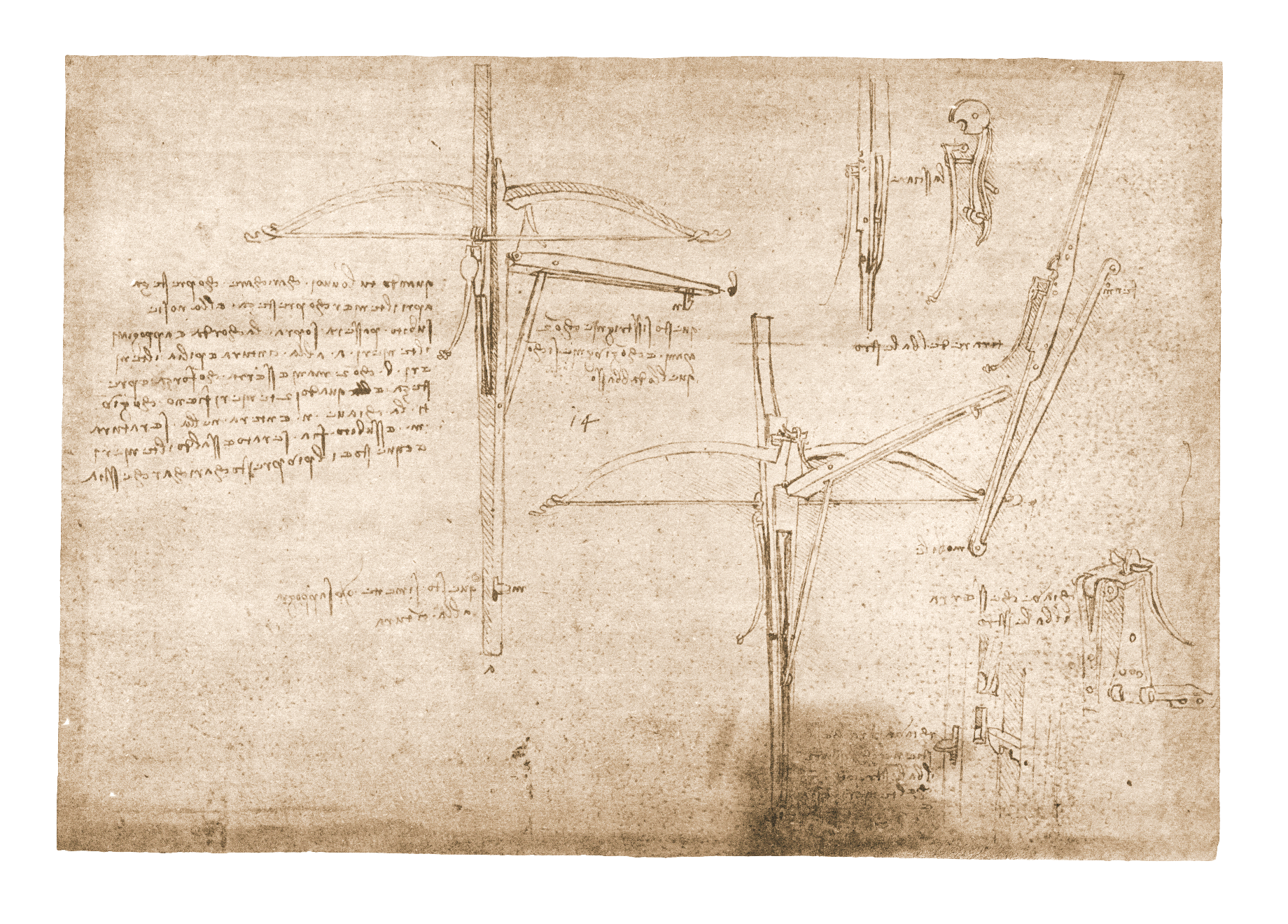
Sketches of a rapid-fire crossbow by Leonardo da Vinci on folio 153r of the Codex Atlanticus

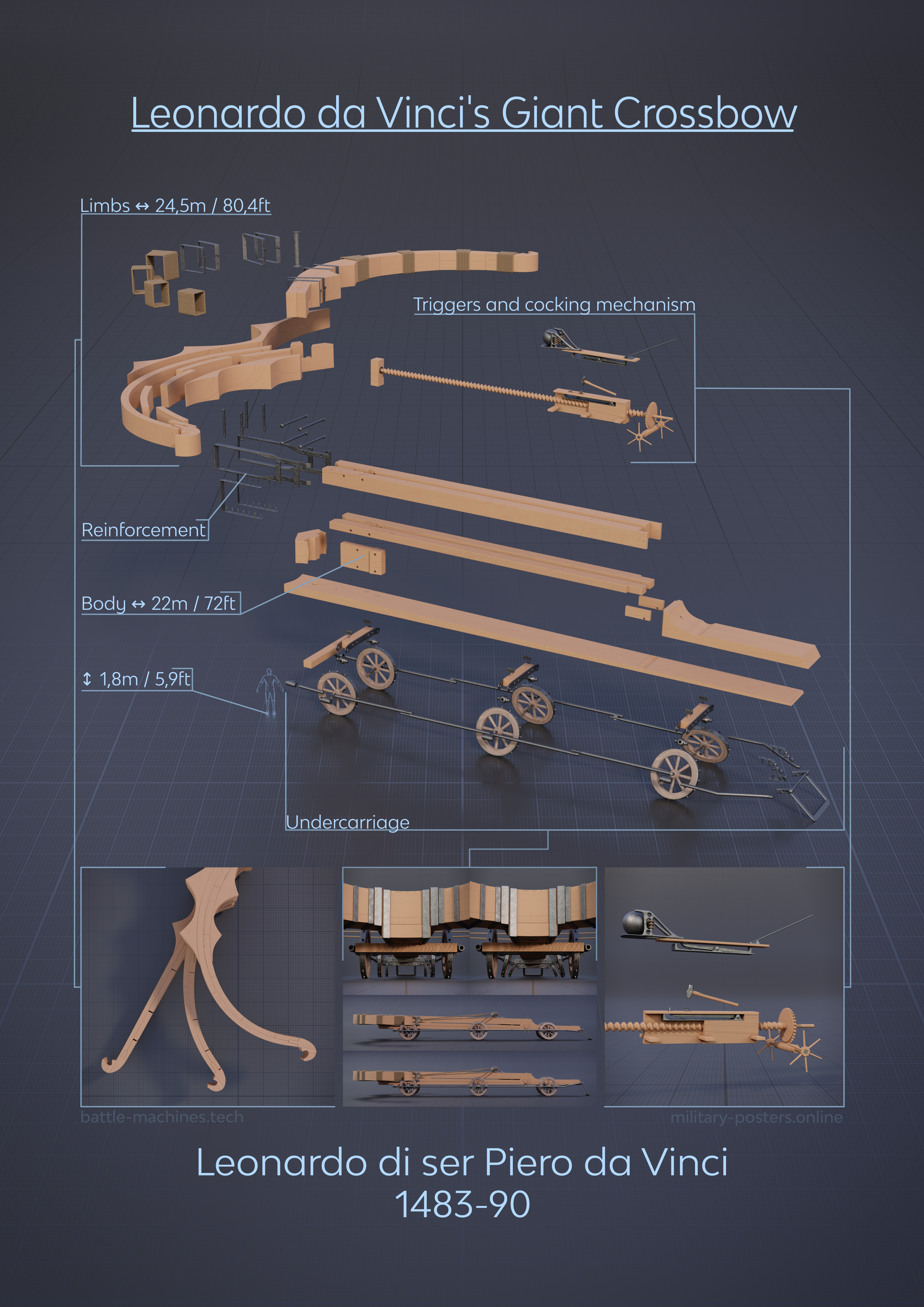
A 3D rendering of Leonardo da Vinci's giant crossbow design

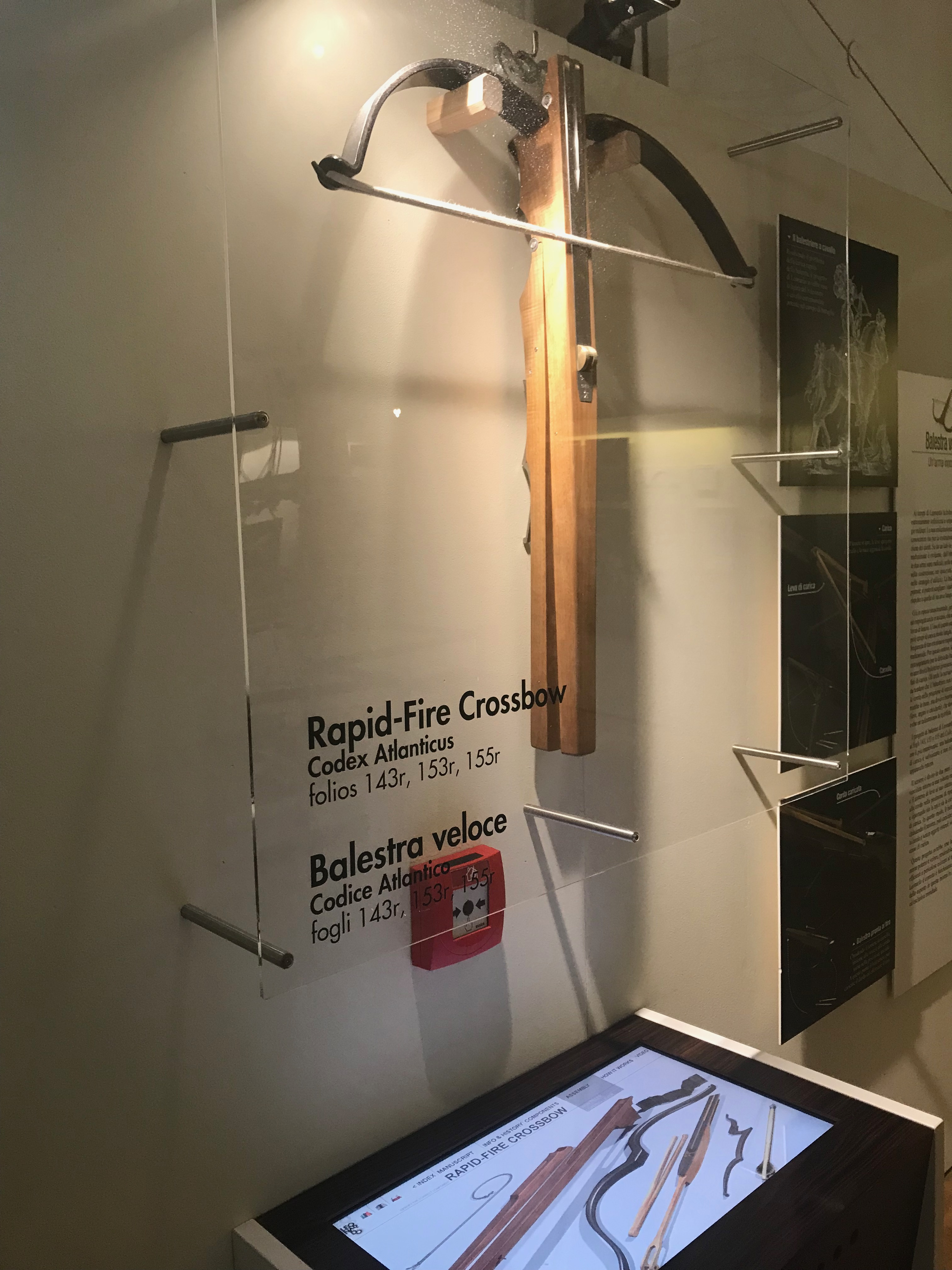
A replica of the rapid-fire crossbow in the Leonardo3 museum in Milan

Leonardo's crossbow designs are a series of shooting weapon schematics designed by Leonardo da Vinci that are in the Codex Atlanticus. One version, a self-spanning infantry weapon called the rapid-fire crossbow (balestra veloce in Italian), is found on sheets 143r, 153r, and 155r. The other is the giant crossbow (balestra gigante in Italian) design intended to be a mounted siege weapon found on sheet 149a in the Codex.

The creation of the large design is linked to Ludovico Sforza, an Italian prince in the Renaissance era. Given the constant warfare in the Italian peninsula at the time, he wanted to expand and advance both his military and the territory he governed in the Milan region. To do so, he wanted to update the contemporary treatise on military engineering by Roberto Valturio. Leonardo responded by writing Sforza a letter that included a number of innovative machine designs with one of them being the giant crossbow. Leonardo also highlighted in the letter his expertise in engineering; most likely having known that Sforza wanted to hire military engineers at the time.

While there is no exact date for the illustrations of Leonardo's crossbows, they are generally believed to be drafted between 1483 and the early 1490s. Many scholars generally agree that Leonardo completed the drawings in the manuscript in Milan, but there is debate as to why he originally went there. Some believe he came to Milan in search of work as a painter and then he got news of Sforza's military desires upon arriving. Others suggest that the initial reason he came directly to Milan was to work for Sforza.

== Design ==
The crossbow as a weapon had been around long before Leonardo's designs. However, his designs made the weapon more advanced and why Leonardo's crossbows stands out. If a crossbow is designed with a narrower shaft and a tapered bolt, which adjusts the nocking of arrows, it greatly improves the airflow of the bow and the drag on arrows. This allows the crossbow to operate much more efficiently and have a more precise aim. These ideas were present in Leonardo's designs and were developed independently of any other influences.

The mathematics that Leonardo utilized to construct his crossbow designs were far advanced despite having some now known inaccuracies with today's current knowledge of geometrics and design. Nonetheless, Leonardo was "the first modern engineer to attempt to apply the geometrical mathematics of the laws of motion to the design of machines." The other mathematical marvel that is noted in Leonardo's designs of the crossbows is the proportional techniques that he utilized in every aspect of the designs.

Mechanically, the rapid-fire crossbow's tiller was split into two stacked wooden pieces held together at the front by a hinge and held in place at the back by a spring-loaded latch. Sandwiched inside the tiller, a pair of interconnected folding levers attach the lower half of the tiller to a sliding plank sitting on the top half of the tiller between the two metal prods, similar in mechanical concept to the Gastraphetes, that contained the rolling nut and spring-loaded sear at the back of the plank. Meanwhile, the bottom half of the tiller contained the trigger. Upon pressing a switch on the side of the tiller to release the latch, the user can then fold the bottom half of the tiller down. At the same time, the interconnected levers then push the sliding plank forward until the drawstring is caught by the rolling nut, which is held secure by the sear's spring tension. Upon pushing the bottom half of the tiller back into place, the latch locks the upper and lower halves of the tiller back together. After a bolt is loaded on the crossbow and aimed, the trigger is then pulled to compress the sear's spring and enable the rolling nut to release the drawstring to propel the bolt. Such a design removed the need for external spanning tools that an arbalist had to carry and simplified the arming process of the crossbow.

With regards to the giant crossbow, the original idea of Leonardo, as described in the drawings of the Codex Atlanticus (1488–1489), was to build a large crossbow in order to increase the range and power of its ammunition. The giant crossbow was used to fire rocks and bombs; it was mostly intended to be an intimidation-based weapon for deterring foes from attacking. The giant crossbow was made up of thin wood, on 6 wheels, 27 yards across, and made up of 39 separate parts. While some believe that Leonardo designed the giant crossbow for his own amusement, the context around this design suggests the giant crossbow truly was intended to be a dangerous weapon that would greatly appeal to his employer, Ludovico Sforza. Inspiration for such a weapon most likely stemmed from the fact that Leonardo grew up in Italy during the 15th century. This meant he was a witness to the constant warfare between the many city-states in his area. Thus, Leonardo put extensive time and effort into designs that could both protect his fellow citizens and greatly harm the enemy. The giant crossbow supports this theory in that the intended enormous size of the weapon was meant to invoke fear and panic in its enemies to keep them away, but it would still have the capability to cause great damage and injury had it been actually constructed and used.

== Working replicas ==
After a prototype of the rapid-fire crossbow built in 2013, the first working model was released on 24 June 2015 during a demonstration at the Castello Sforzesco in Milan. The working replica of the infantry weapon was the culmination of a study conducted by Edoardo Zanon of the Leonardo3 study center in respect of the processing and assembly techniques available at the time of Leonardo.

The model allows precision shooting and is equipped with a fast internal spanning mechanism, non-existent even in most modern handheld crossbows. The working model built is on display at the Leonardo3 – The World of Leonardo museum at the Piazza della Scala in Milan, Italy.

As for the giant crossbow, it was never constructed by its designer; either as scaled model or as a fully fledged siege weapon. However, a working model was built to a scale of 1:1. It was shown in the ITN documentary Leonardo's Dream Machines, which was aired for the first time in February 2003 by Channel 4.

== See also ==
- List of works by Leonardo da Vinci
- Codex Atlanticus
- Cheiroballistra
- Lever action firearms
- Polybolos
- Repeating crossbow
- Science and inventions of Leonardo da Vinci
