= Polybolos =

Ancient Greek siege engine

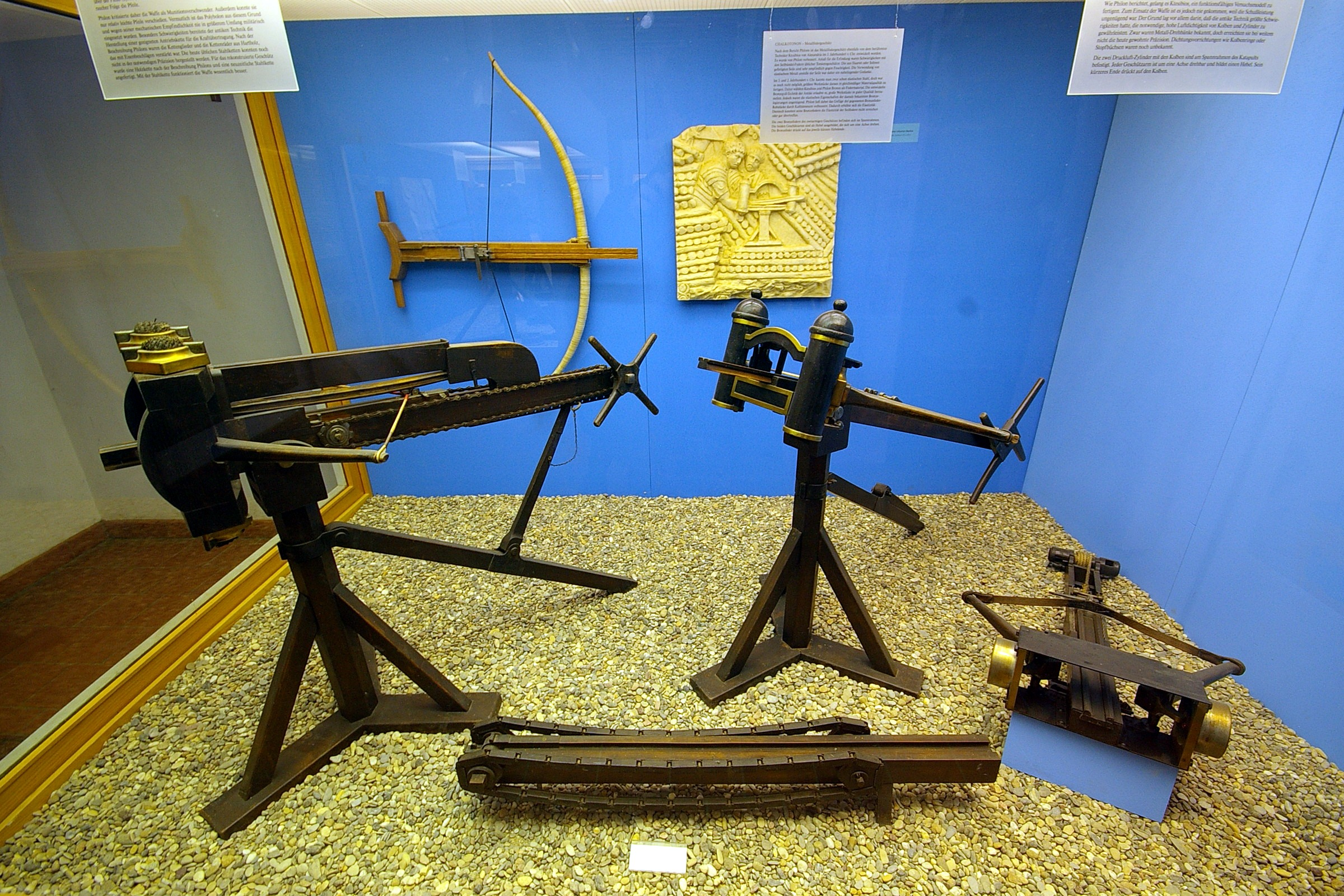
Arsenal of ancient mechanical artillery in the Saalburg, Germany; left: polybolos reconstruction by the German engineer Erwin Schramm (1856–1935)

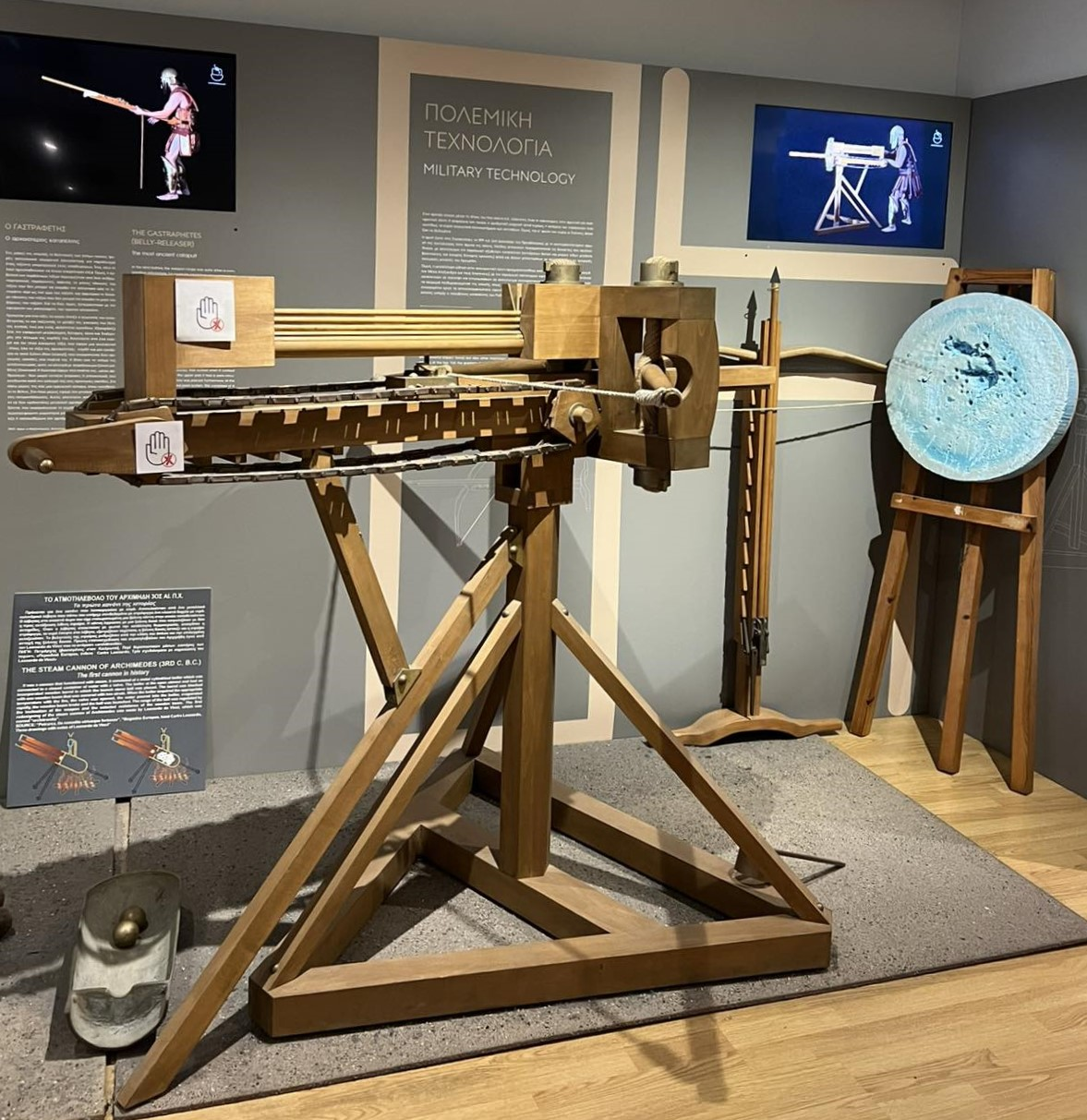
A modern reconstruction of the repeating "polybolos" catapult of Dionysius of Alexandria, in Kotsanas Museum of Ancient Greek Technology, Athens, Greece.

The polybolos (the name means "multi-thrower" in Greek) was an ancient Greek repeating ballista, reputedly invented by Dionysius of Alexandria (a 3rd-century BC Greek engineer at the Rhodes arsenal,) and used in antiquity. The polybolos was not a crossbow since it used a torsion mechanism, drawing its power from twisted sinew-bundles. However the earlier and similar oxybeles employed a tension crossbow mechanism, before it was abandoned in favor of torsion.

Philo of Byzantium (c. 280 BC – c. 220 BC) encountered and described a weapon similar to the polybolos, a catapult that could fire again and again without a need for manual reloading. Philo left a detailed description of the gears that powered its chain drive (the oldest known application of such a mechanism) and that placed bolt after bolt into its firing slot.

== Design ==
The polybolos would have differed from an ordinary ballista in that it had a wooden hopper magazine, capable of holding several dozen bolts, that was positioned over the mensa (the cradle that holds the bolt prior to firing). The mechanism is unique in that it is driven by a flat-link chain connected to a windlass. The mensa itself was a sliding plank (similar to that on the gastraphetes) containing the claw latches used to pull back the drawstring and was attached to the chain link. When loading a new bolt and spanning the drawstring, the windlass is rotated counterclockwise by an operator standing on the left side of the weapon; this drives the mensa forward towards the bow string. At the very front, a metal lug triggers the latching claws into catching the drawstring.

Once the string is held firm by the trigger mechanism, the windlass is then rotated clockwise; pulling the mensa back and drawing the bow string with it. At the same time, a round wooden pole in the bottom of the magazine is rotated via a spiral groove being driven by a rivet attached to the sliding mensa; dropping a single bolt from a carved notch in the rotating pole. With the drawstring pulled back and a bolt loaded on the mensa, the polybolos is ready to be fired. As the windlass is rotated further back to the very back end, the claws on the mensa meets another lug like the one that pushed the claws into catching the string. This one causes the claws to disengage the drawstring and automatically fires the loaded bolt. Upon the bolt being fired, the process is repeated. The repetition provides the weapon's name, in Greek πολυβόλος, "throwing many missiles", from πολύς (polys), "multiple, many" and -βόλος (-bolos) "thrower", in turn from βάλλω (ballo), "to throw, to hurl", literally a multithrower.

A series of marks from ancient impacts on the walls of Pompeii, similar to those made by modern machine guns have been attributed to a polybolos operated by the troops of Roman commander Lucius Cornelius Sulla, who besieged the city in 89 BCE.

== Popular culture ==
In 2010, a MythBusters episode was dedicated to building and testing a replica, and concluded that its existence as a historical weapon was plausible. However, the machine MythBusters built was prone to breakdowns that had to be fixed multiple times.

== See also ==
- Gastraphetes
- Repeating crossbow
- Rapid fire crossbow
- Chain gun
- Panjagan

== Bibliography ==
- Duncan B. Campbell and Brian Delf, Greek and Roman Artillery 399 BC–AD 363, New Vanguard series 89, Osprey Publishing Ltd., Oxford 2003. ISBN 1 84176 634 8
- Joseph Needham, Science and Civilization in China: Volume 5, Chemistry and Chemical Technology; Part 6, Military Technology: Missiles and Sieges, Cambridge University Press, Cambridge 1995. ISBN 978-0521327275, 052132727X
