= Leonardo3 Museum =

Interactive museum in Milan, Italy

Leonardo3 – The World of Leonardo da Vinci
- Leonardo3 Museum – Il mondo di Leonardo
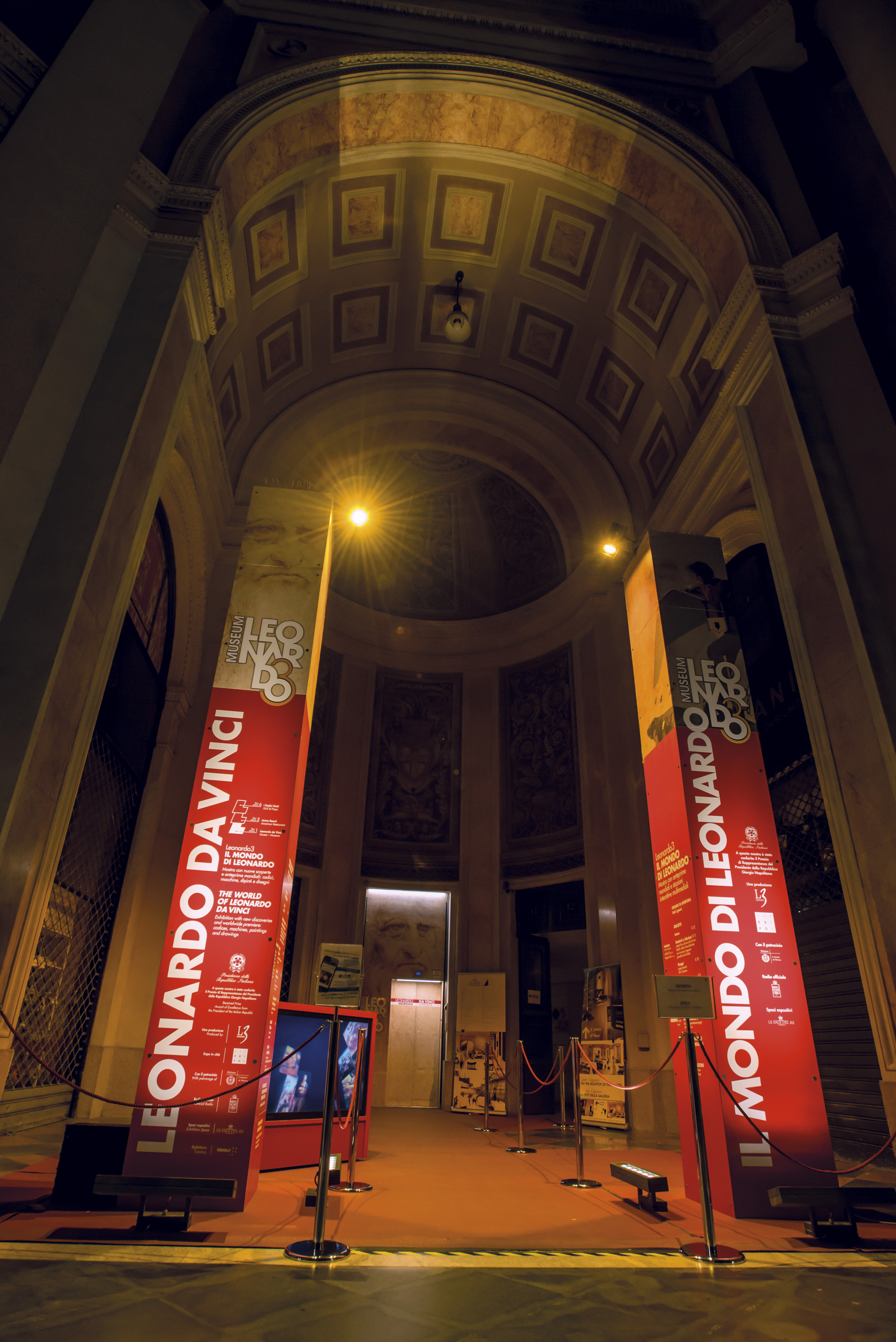
- Coordinates: 45°27′59″N 9°11′24″E
- Founders: Mario Taddei, Massimiliano Lisa, Edoardo Zanon
- Website: leonardo3.net

Leonardo3 is an interactive museum and exhibition center at Galleria Vittorio Emanuele II, Piazza della Scala, Milano, Italy. The museum was inaugurated in 2013, and is devoted to Italy's notable personality Leonardo da Vinci, who is portrayed both as an artist and inventor.

== Description ==
The Leonardo3 museum has physical models and machines based on daVinci's designs and a digital version of the Codex Atlanticus, which contains the notes and sketches of the inventor. The museum has the provision to explore independently or with many hands-on displays, touch screens, or with the help of audio guides in English, French, Chinese, Italian, Russian, German, and Spanish and can interact with more than 200 digital reconstructions.

The museum has received an Award of excellence from the President of the Italian Republic.

== Exhibits ==
The museum exhibits working models of da Vinci's machine and his musical instruments like Rapid-fire Crossbow, Mechanical Eagle, Mechanical Submarine, Mechanical Dragonfly, Great Kite, Rapid Fire Crossbow, Musical Cannon, Time Machine, Harpsichord Viola, the Areial Screw with spring engine, Giant Trumpet, Mechanical Lion and many others.

The digitally restored The Last Supper painting, one of the famous works of Leonardo, provides information about the science and story behind it.

== See also ==
- Museo leonardiano di Vinci
  - Museo Ideale Leonardo da Vinci
- Museo Nazionale Scienza e Tecnologia Leonardo da Vinci (Milan)
