= The Da Vinci Code (disambiguation) =

The Da Vinci Code is a novel by Dan Brown published in 2003.

The Da Vinci Code may also refer to:

- The Da Vinci Code (film), the 2006 film based on the novel
  - The Da Vinci Code (soundtrack), a CD based on the music of the film
- The Da Vinci Code (video game), the 2006 game based on the novel, and timed for release with the movie
- The Da Vinci Code (play), a 2022 stage adaption based on the novel

== See also ==
- Da Vinci (disambiguation)
