= Vincy =

Vincy may refer to:

- A national, or the country of Saint Vincent and the Grenadines
- Les Rues-des-Vignes, a commune in northern France, known as Vincy during the Middle Ages
- The Battle of Vincy, an eighth-century battle at Les Rues-des-Vignes
- Vincy Chan (born 1982), a Chinese singer who performs under the name "Vincy"

== See also ==
- Vinci (disambiguation)
