= Toiano, Vinci =

Toiano
- Frazione
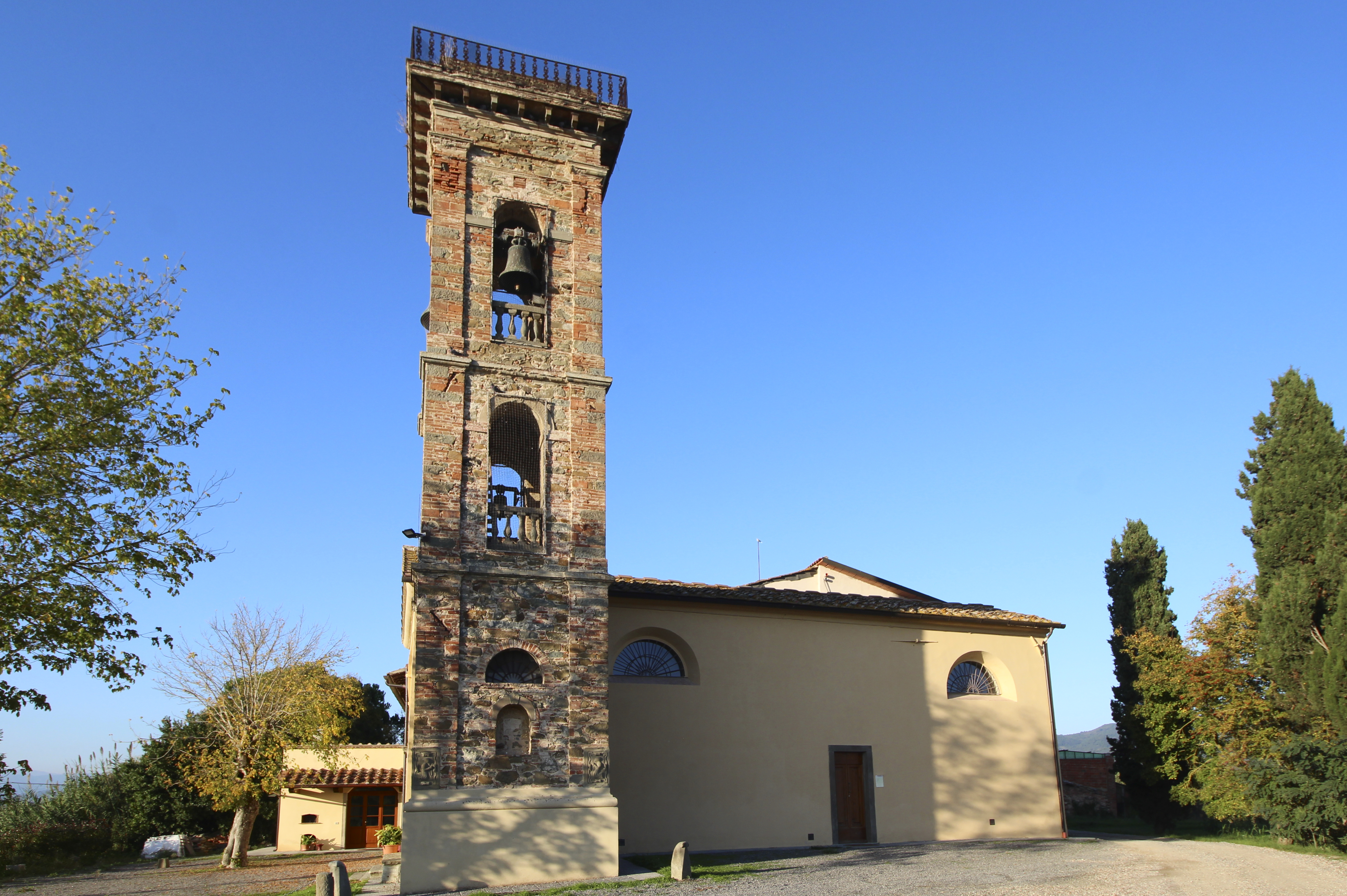
- The church of San Bartolomeo a Streda

- Location of Toiano in Italy
- Coordinates: 43°46′12″N 10°53′52″E
- Country: Italy
- Region: Tuscany
- Province: Florence (FI)
- Comune: Vinci
- Elevation: 85 m (279 ft)

Population (2011)
  - Total: 201
- Time zone: UTC+1 (CET)
  - Summer (DST): UTC+2 (CEST)

Toiano is a village in Tuscany, central Italy, administratively a frazione of the comune of Vinci, Metropolitan City of Florence. At the time of the 2001 census its population was 213.

Toiano is about 43 km from Florence and 2 km from Vinci.
