= DaVinci (software) =

Development tool used to create HTML5 mobile applications

DaVinci was a development tool produced by Incross, which aimed at creating HTML5 mobile applications and media content. It included a jQuery framework and a JavaScript library that enabled developers and designers to craft web applications designed for mobile devices with a user experience similar to native applications. Business applications, games, rich media content, such as HTML5 multi-media magazines, advertisements, and animation, may be produced with the tool. DaVinci was based on standard web technology – including HTML5, CSS3, and JavaScript.

== Features ==
DaVinci comprised DaVinci Studio and DaVinci Animator, which handled application programming and UI design. The tool had a WYSIWYG authoring environment.

Open-source libraries, such as KnockOut, JsRender/JsViews, Impress.js, and turn.js, were included in the tool. Other open-source frameworks could also be integrated.

The Model View Controller (MVC) and Data Binding in JavaScript could be handled through DaVinci's Data-Set Editor. In this mode, view components and model data could be visually bound, which allowed users to create web applications with server-integrated UI components without coding.

Additionally, DaVinci included an N-Screen editor, which automatically adjusted designs and functionalities to fit the screen sizes of various devices, including smartphones, tablet PCs, and TVs.

== DaVinci and jQuery ==
In collaboration with the jQuery Foundation, DaVinci played a significant role in hosting the first jQuery conference in an Asian district, which took place on November 12, 2012, in Seoul, South Korea. The conference showcased how DaVinci could be utilized in application development demonstrations.

== See also ==
- Mobile application development
- Silverlight
