= Museo leonardiano di Vinci =

Museum dedicated to Leonardo da Vinci in Italy

Leonardian Museum of Vinci
- Museo Leonardiano di Vinci
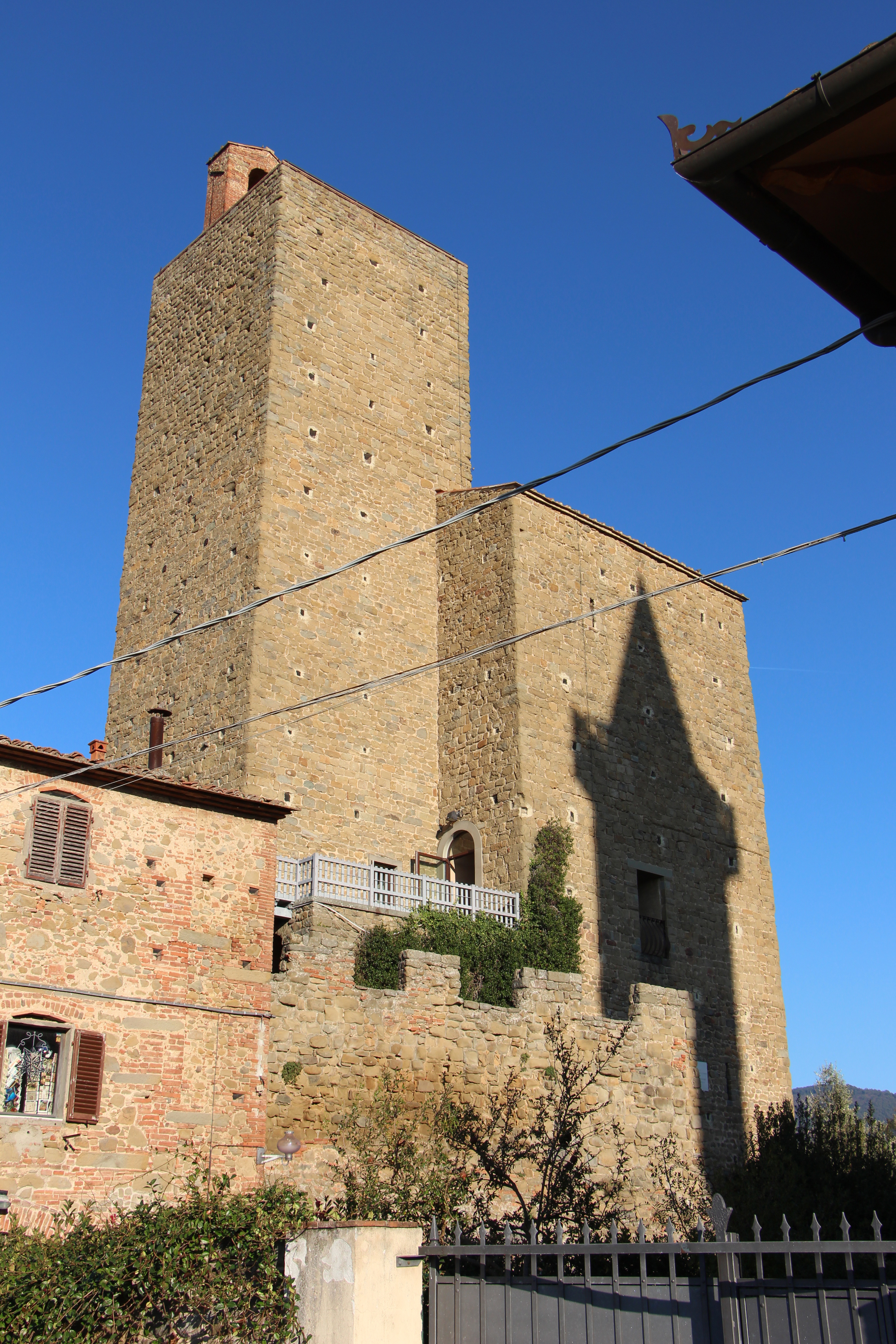
- Conti Guidi Castle, historic seat of the museum
- Established: 1953
- Location: Piazza dei Conti Guidi, 1, Vinci, Italy
- Coordinates: 43°47′15″N 10°55′38″E
- Type: Historic, Technological
- Website: museoleonardiano.it

The Museo Leonardiano di Vinci, or Leonardian Museum of Vinci, is a museum dedicated to Leonardo da Vinci, located in Vinci, Leonardo's birthplace, in the province of Florence, Italy.

The museum houses one of the largest collections of models constructed on the basis of Leonardo da Vinci's drawings. Over 60 models are exhibited, presented with precise references to the artist's sketches and handwritten annotations, also accompanied by digital animations and interactive applications. The first rooms are set up in the Palazzina Uzielli (Museo Ideale Leonardo da Vinci) while the remaining exhibition sections are housed in the medieval Castello dei Conti Guidi, the historic seat of the museum.

== History ==
The idea of opening a museum dedicated to Leonardo da Vinci was born in 1919, on the occasion of the celebrations for the fourth centenary of his death, but it opened to the public only in 1953 thanks to the gesture of IBM, which donated a series of models reconstructed on the basis of Leonardo's drawings. Time has passed since then and today the museum itinerary is arranged over several locations: the first rooms are set up in the Palazzina Uzielli while the remaining exhibition sections are housed in the medieval Castello dei Conti Guidi, the historic seat of the museum. The itinerary also includes the "Leonardo and Painting" section at Villa del Ferrale and Leonardo's birthplace in Anchiano.

The museum is accessed from the Piazza dei Guidi. The Palazzina Uzielli hosts the sections "Construction machinery", "Textile manufacturing machines", "Mechanical clocks" and "Leonardo and Anatomy". At the Palazzina there are also spaces dedicated to temporary exhibitions and a large room for educational paths.

The Castello dei Conti Guidi houses the sections: "War machines", "Bridges", "Studies on flight", "Mechanisms and tools", "The bicycle and the self-propelled chariot", "The waters", "The optics and perspective" and "The geometric solids".

The Villa del Ferrale hosts a section on Leonardo's life as a painter, with reproductions of his paintings and drawings, made in high definition and life-size. The reproductions alternate with didactic installations and explanatory videos.

The visit ends with Leonardo's birthplace, where a life-size hologram tells his personal life.

== Palazzina Uzielli ==
On the first floor there are sections dedicated to construction machinery, textile technology and mechanical watches.

The first room documents Leonardo's re-elaborations based on Filippo Brunelleschi's projects for the construction of the dome of the Florence Cathedral. The young Leonardo, an apprentice at the Bottega del Verrocchio, was deeply impressed by the complexity of the machines on that site where he was able to witness the casting and installation of the large copper sphere placed on the lantern of the dome.

The textile technology room documents Leonardo's interest in the production cycle of fabrics and presents his ambitions to achieve the automation of the manufacturing cycle.

Vinciano's passion for mechanisms is also evidenced in the room of mechanical watches which presents models of measuring instruments. Inside the Palazzina Uzielli there are also rooms for temporary exhibitions and a large didactic room for the didactic paths offered by the museum.

== Conti Guidi Castle ==
The tour continues inside the Conti Guidi castle, where 60 other models of Leonardo's machines are exhibited.

In the rooms on the ground floor there are various models of machines: from military ones to those for flying, to instruments for scientific use.

On the first floor, among the models of machines for moving in the air, in the water and on the land - including Leonardo's self-propelled chariot or "car", inside the Podestà room, the large swing wing and the working model, in scale 1: 2, of the crane built for the completion of the cusp of the dome of Santa Maria del Fiore in Florence.

Finally, the optics room dedicated to Leonardo's studies in the physics of light and with particular reference to the period from Alhazen to Kepler.

At the top of the tower is the video room, equipped for the projection of documentaries on Leonardo, which also houses nine solid models designed for Luca Pacioli's De Divina Proportione.

== Gallery ==
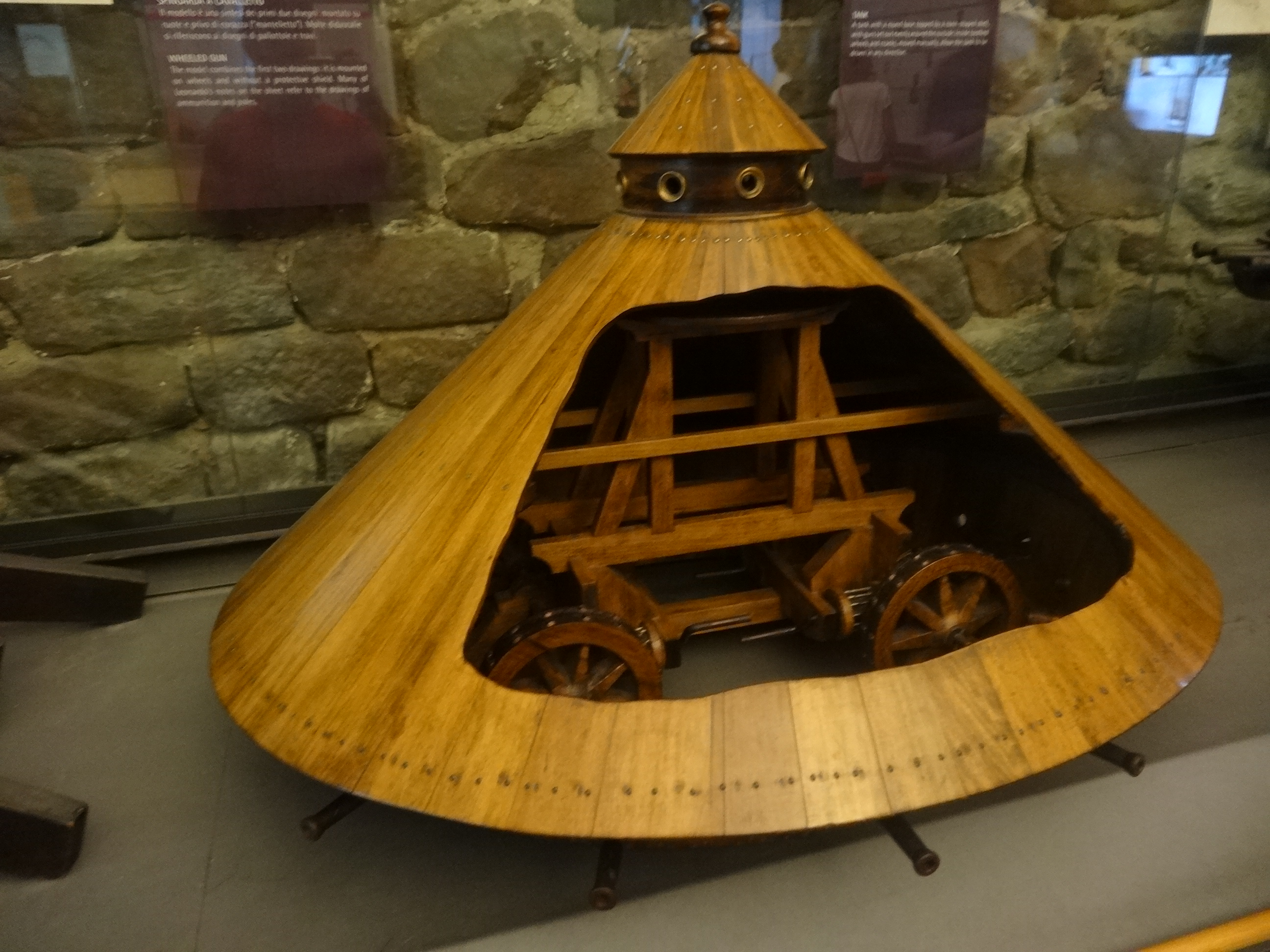
Model of Leonardo's fighting vehicle

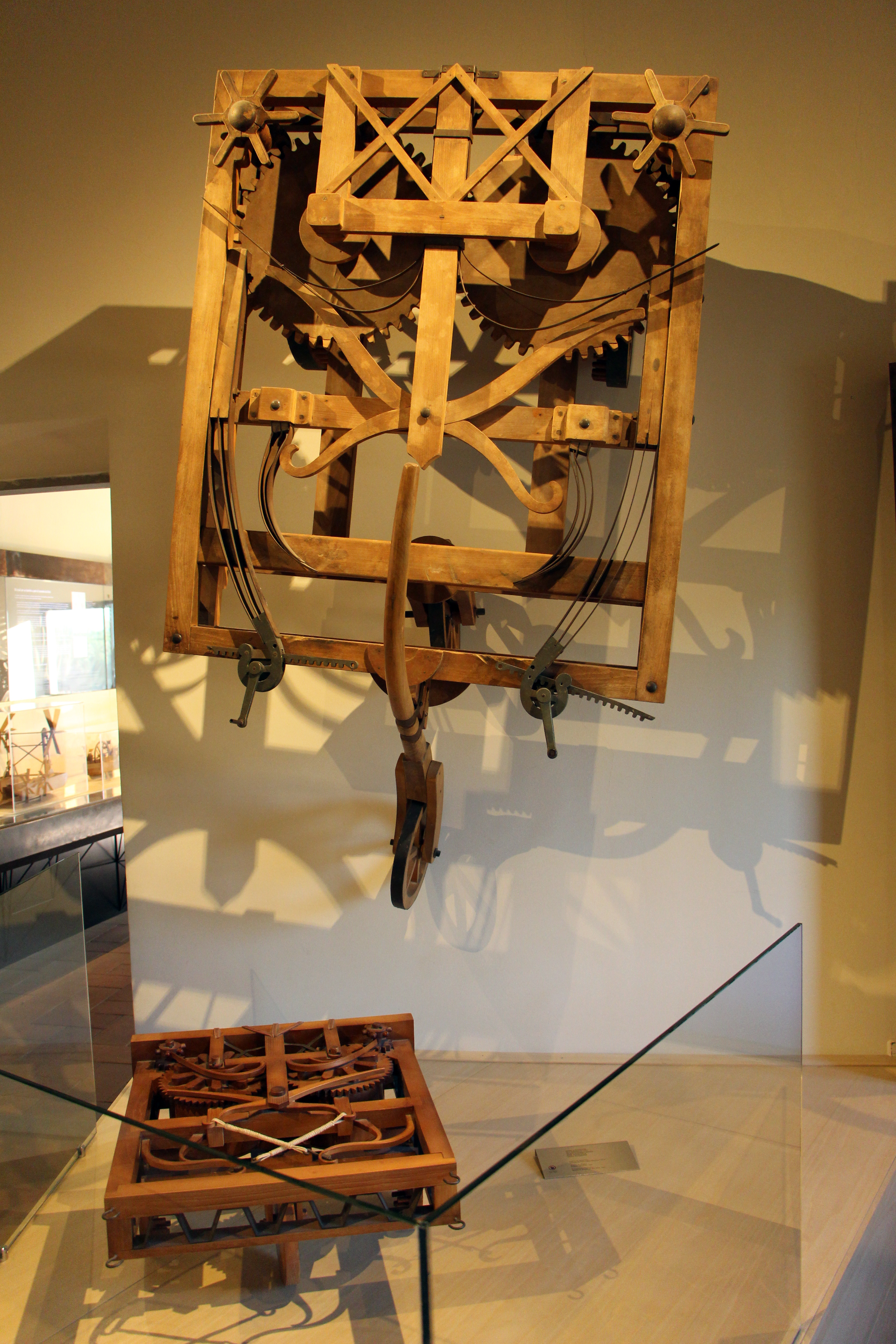
Model of Leonardo's self-propelled cart

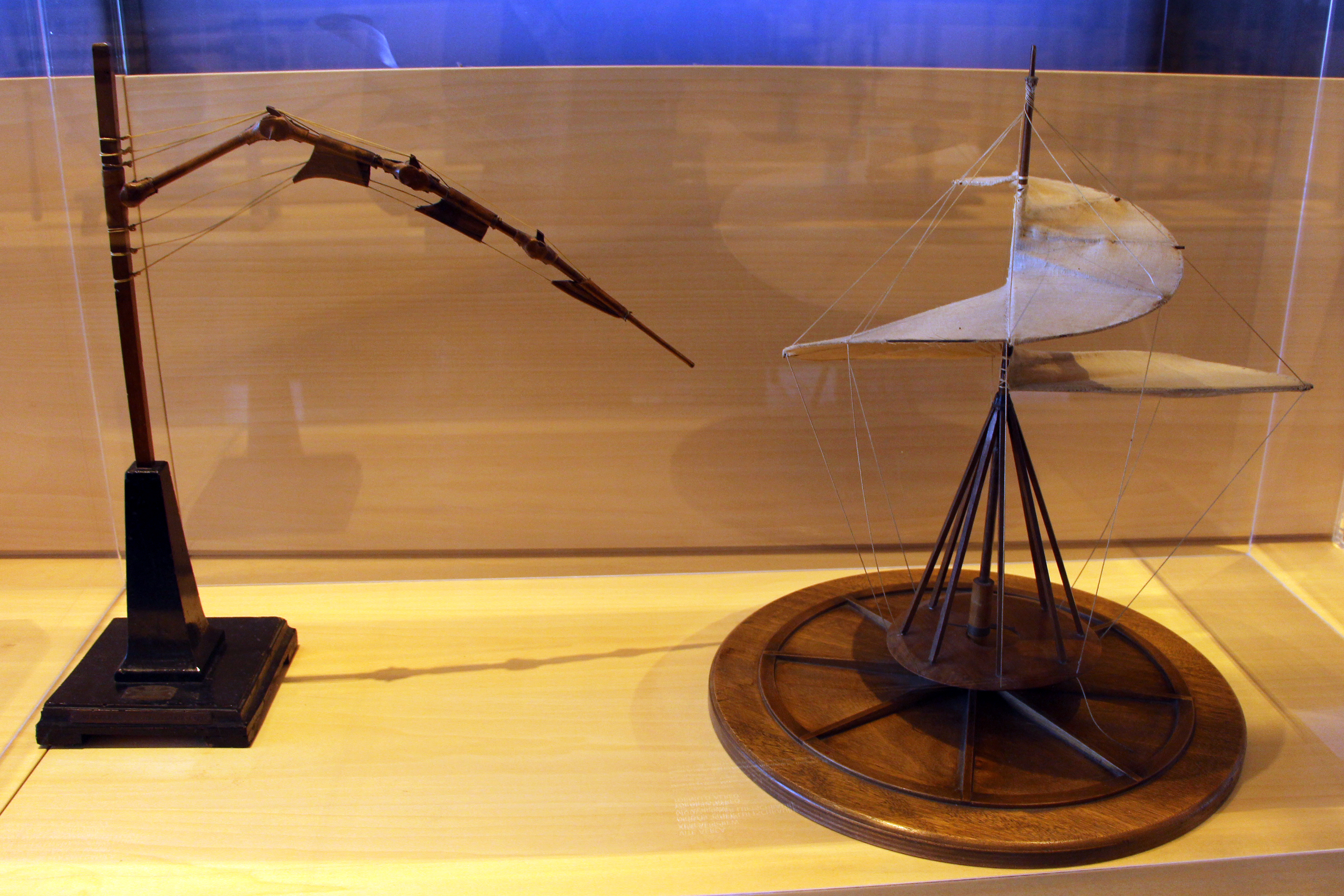
Modern models of Leonardo's aerial screw

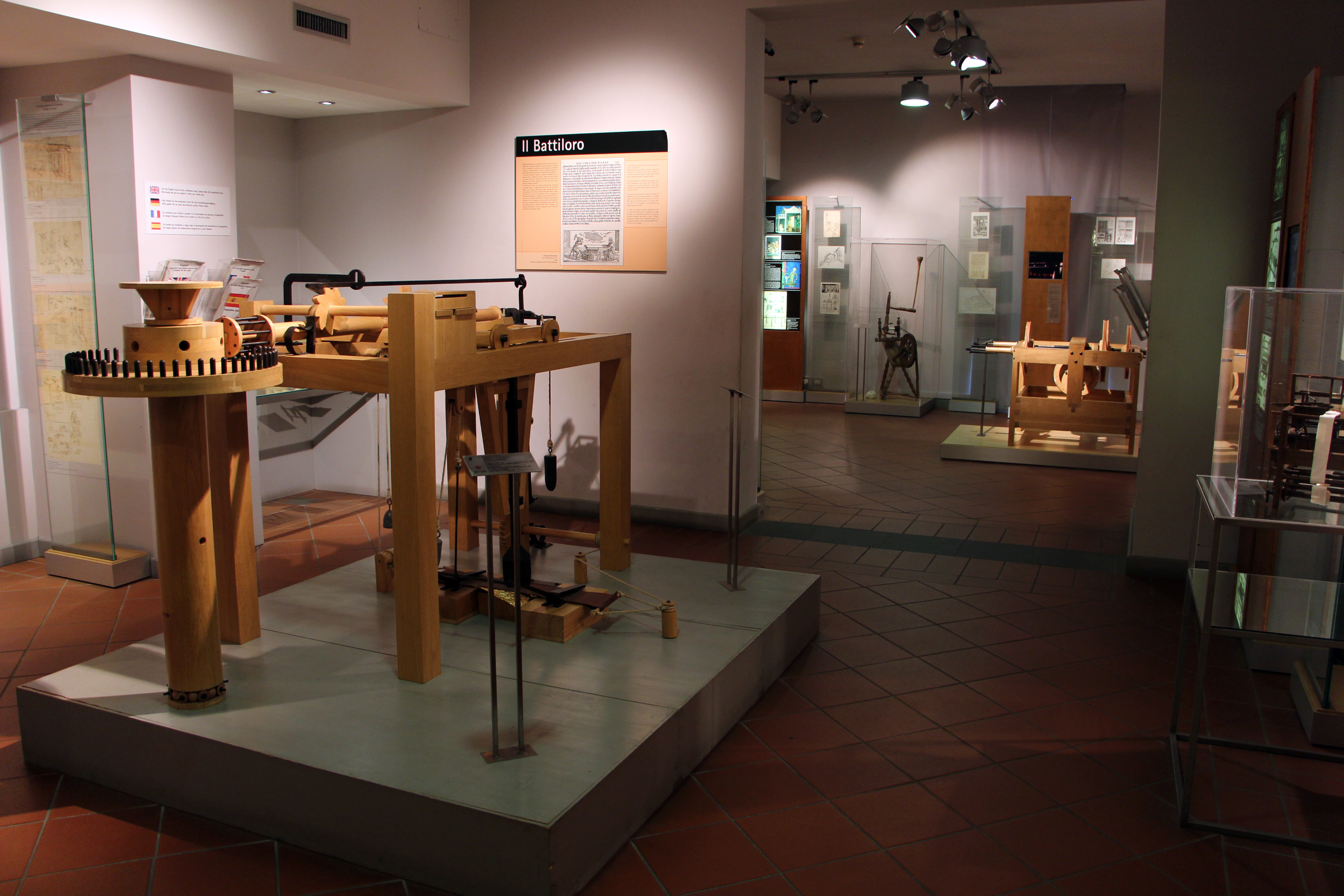
Section of the palazzina Uzielli

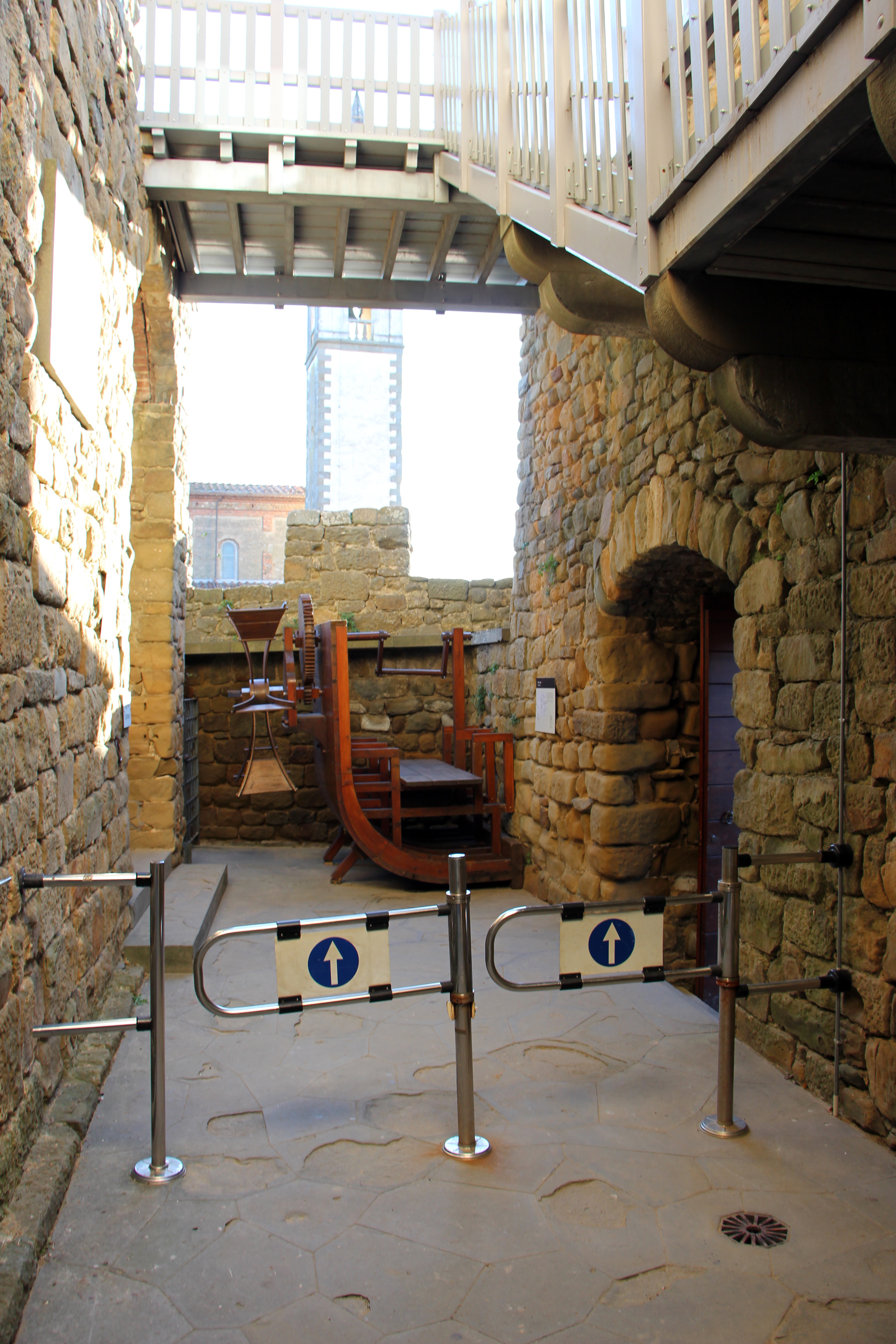
Entrance of the Conti Guidi Castle

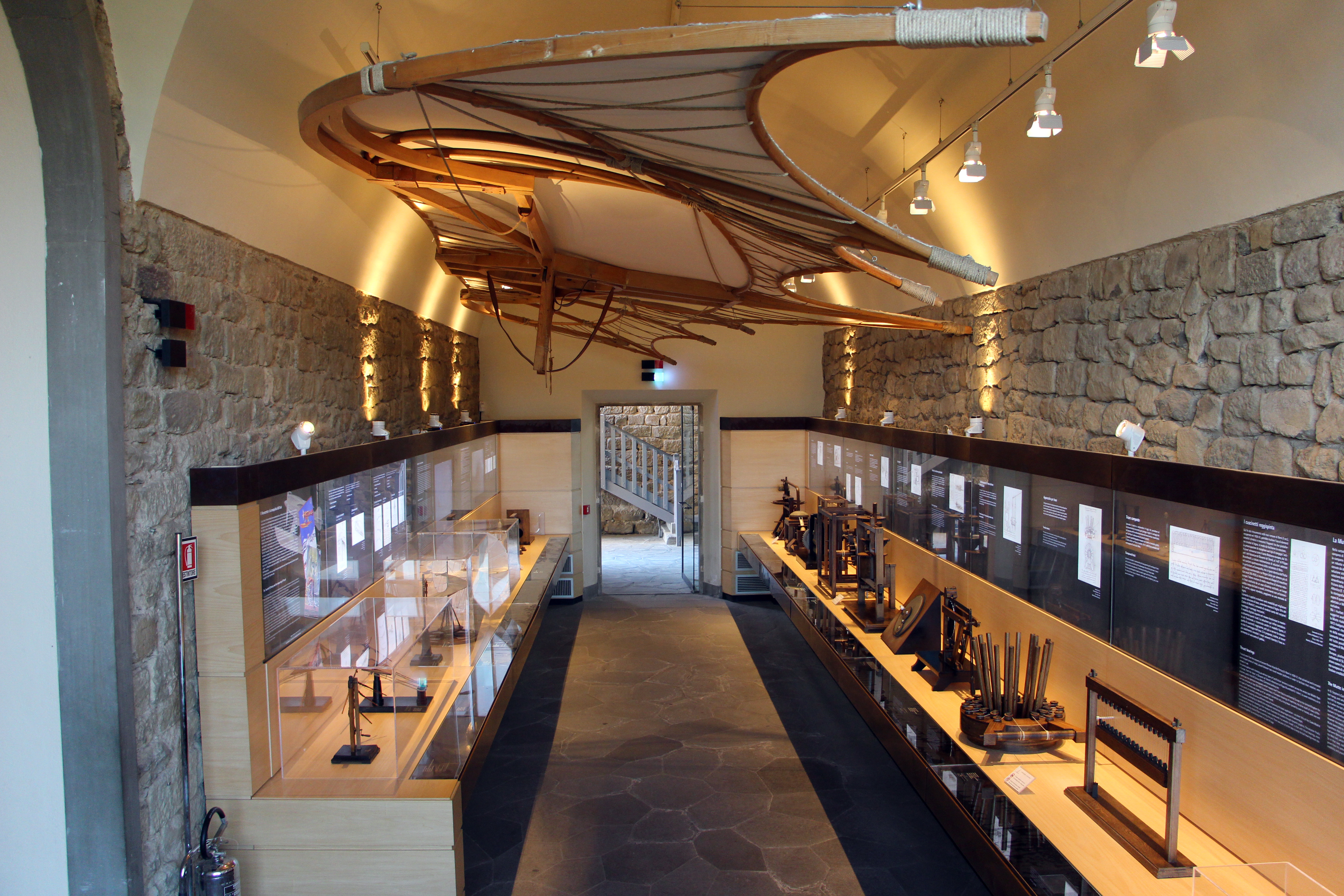
A section of the museum

== See also ==
- Museo Ideale Leonardo da Vinci
- Museo Nazionale Scienza e Tecnologia Leonardo da Vinci
- Leonardo3 Museum
