= Anchiano =

- Frazione
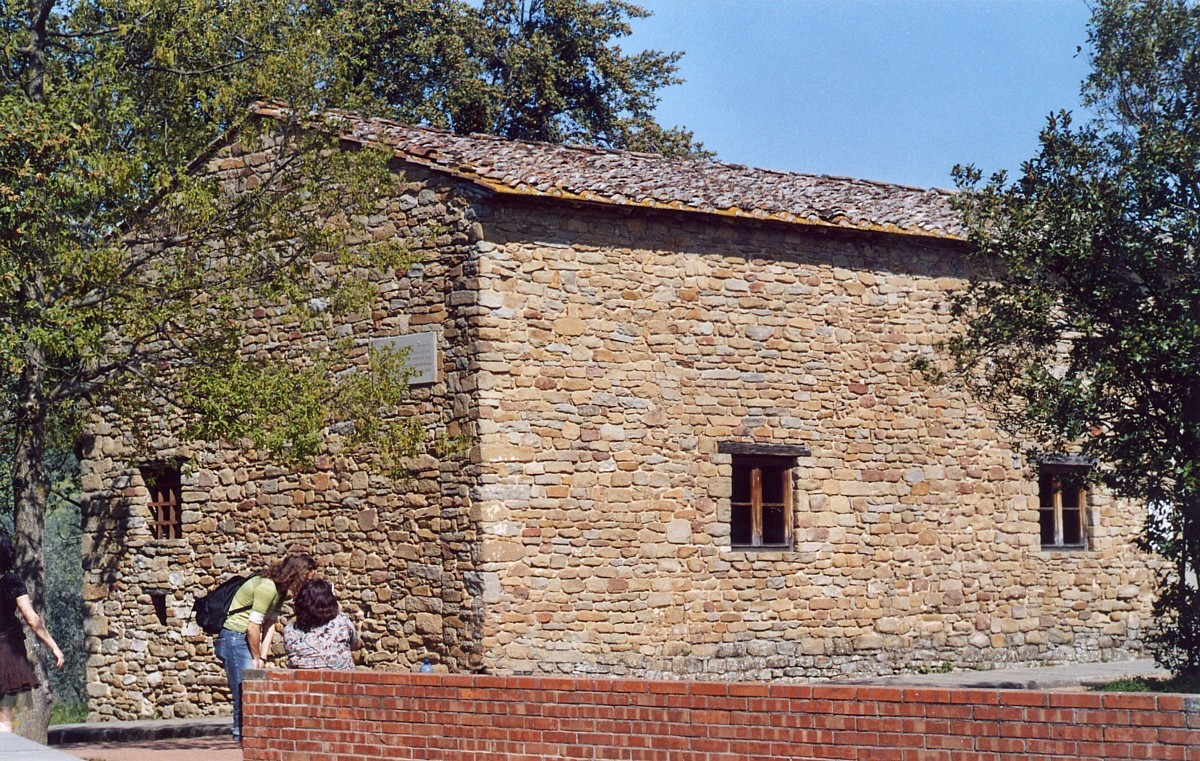
- Leonardo da Vinci's possible birthplace

- Location of Anchiano in Italy
- Coordinates: 43°47′57″N 10°56′17″E
- Country: Italy
- Region: Tuscany
- Province: Florence (FI)
- Comune: Vinci
- Elevation: 210 m (690 ft)
- Time zone: UTC+1 (CET)
  - Summer (DST): UTC+2 (CEST)

Anchiano is a hamlet (frazione) in the comune of Vinci, Metropolitan City of Florence, Tuscany, central Italy.

The village is known for the ancient Villa del Ferrale, with its chapel, Santi Antonio e Francesco.

== Notable residents ==
- Leonardo da Vinci was born in a farmhouse near Anchiano on 15 April 1452. His full name was "Leonardo di ser Piero da Vinci", which means "Leonardo, son of Piero, from Vinci". The house where Leonardo da Vinci was born is situated between Anchiano and Faltognano, about 3 km from Vinci.
