= Oleg Jelesko =

- Олег Железко
- Born: 26 September 1969 (age 56); Aktobe, Kazakh Soviet Socialist Republic, Soviet Union
- Occupation: Entrepreneur
- Organization: Da Vinci Capital
- Known for: Founder of the London based investment company Da Vinci Capital

Oleg Jelesko (born 26 September 1969, Aktobe, Kazakh SSR, USSR) is a British entrepreneur that invests in private equity and fintech companies. Born in the Soviet Union he is the founder and managing partner of the investment company Da Vinci Capital, based in London and Dubai. He previously headed the structured products at Russian investment bank Renaissance Capital.

== Career ==
Jelesko started his career in 1992 at the consulting company Andersen Consulting (London) as a business consultant. He worked on information technology projects and developed business strategies for companies in the UK, Europe, and emerging markets. He also worked for McKinsey & Company (McK), where he was based in the CIS and Czech markets. He also took a mini MBA course in USA while working for McK.

In July 1998, he joined the investment bank Credit Suisse First Boston in London as Chief Operating Officer in the EMEA Equities.

In 2004, he joined Renaissance Capital, where he took the position of Head of the Structured Products Group. Oleg Jelesko launched a platform for alternative investments in emerging markets, managing assets from 30 investment funds and investment products and ran its sales and trading activities. As a result, in 2005, about $5 billion were raised, with significant profits for investors from public and pre-IPO markets in the region.

In 2007 he founded the investment company Da Vinci Capital with the main focus on private equity funds and co-investments. As managing partner, he is responsible for the company's development strategy and direct management. The first fund was listed on the LSE as the first ever closed-ended fund on the Specialized Funds Market Platform. By 2022, capital from international institutional investors managed by Da Vinci Capital had reached $500 million. From 2007 to 2022, Da Vinci Capital invested about $1 billion in technology companies such as EPAM, DataArt, Softline, Noventiq, Israel based fintech startups, B2B, Gett Taxi, ITI Group, Ocsial, LoopMe, Udemy, Coursera, and other businesses, helped attract co-investors in large co-investment deals, promoted the private equity markets in Global Emerging Markets technology and fintech sectors.

In 2009, Oleg Jelesko joined the board in EPAM Systems. In 2012, EPAM began trading on the New York Stock Exchange.

In 2008, he joined the board of directors in RTS stock exchange. He dealt with the development of the exchange, derivative products, and the international products such as RTS index. Oleg Jelesko headed the Da Vinci Capital team working on the relevant negotiations of RTS and MICEX merger, which concluded in 2011 with the creation of unified Moscow Exchange. He led international alliance work and liased with LSE and NYSE on a number of financial infrastructure initiatives.

In 2016, he invested and attracted co-investors в IT company Softline. He led the preparation of the IPO on the LSE. The company more than doubled its turnover from $741 million in 2015 to $2.2 billion in 2021. The fund retained its stake in non-Russian part, which became Noventiq, leading global player in Microsoft distribution and other IT solutions.

Oleg Jelesko is a member of the investment committees of funds managed by Da Vinci Capital and several portfolio companies.
