= Leonardo da Vinci: The Mind of the Renaissance =

1996 book by Alessandro Vezzosi

- First Italian edition. The cover featuring the portrait of the Archangel Uriel, detail of the Virgin of the Rocks, Louvre.
- Author: Alessandro Vezzosi
- Original title: Leonardo da Vinci: arte e scienza dell'universo
- Translator: Françoise Liffran (French); Alexandra Bonfante-Warren (English)
- Cover artist: Leonardo da Vinci
- Language: Italian
- Series: Universale Electa/Gallimard●Arte (IT); Découvertes Gallimard●Peinture (FR); Abrams Discoveries (US); New Horizons (UK)
- Release number: 73rd in collection (IT); 293rd in collection (FR)
- Subject: Leonardo da Vinci
- Genre: Illustrated biography, nonfiction monograph
- Publisher: Electa/Gallimard (IT); Éditions Gallimard (FR); Harry N. Abrams (US); Thames & Hudson (UK)
- Publication date: 1 September 1996; 16 April 2010 (new ed.)
- Publication place: Italy
- English publication date: 1997
- Media type: Print (paperback), e-book for iPad (2012)
- Pages: 200 (Italian ed.); 160 (French, UK and US eds.)
- ISBN: 978-88-445-0083-2 (first edition)
- OCLC: 55046911
- Preceded by: Matisse: "uno splendore inaudito" (IT); François Truffaut : Les films de sa vie (FR)
- Followed by: L'oro di Troia e il sogno di Schliemann (IT); Descartes : Bien conduire sa raison (FR)

Leonardo da Vinci: The Mind of the Renaissance (UK title: Leonardo da Vinci: Renaissance Man; Italian: Leonardo da Vinci: arte e scienza dell'universo; French: Léonard de Vinci : Art et science de l'univers, lit. 'Leonardo da Vinci: Art and Science of the Universe') is a 1996 illustrated biography of Leonardo da Vinci authored by the Italian art critic Alessandro Vezzosi, translated from Italian into French by Françoise Liffran, and published by Éditions Gallimard in the same year as the 293rd volume in their "Découvertes" collection (known as "Abrams Discoveries" in the United States, and "New Horizons" in the United Kingdom). The book was adapted into a documentary film in 2001, by the title Léonard de Vinci.

The Italian edition was published by Electa/Gallimard as the 73rd volume in the "Universale Electa/Gallimard" collection, which has a total of 200 pages, whereas the French edition contains only 160 pages. The English translation, however, is based on French text rather than the original Italian, as well as other international editions.

== Introduction ==
From left: first French edition, UK and US editions.

The book is part of the Arts series (formerly belonging to Peinture series) in the "Découvertes Gallimard" collection. According to the tradition of "Découvertes", which is based on an abundant pictorial documentation and a way of bringing together visual documents and texts, enhanced by printing on coated paper, as commented in L'Express, "genuine monographs, published like art books". It's almost like a "graphic novel", replete with colour plates.

Here the author traces the life and work of Leonardo da Vinci—the artist of pittura mentale—from his childhood in Italy to his death in France, in five chapters, followed by a set of "documents". The biography sets his life in the context of the great courts he visited: the Medici of Florence, ducal Milan and royal France. It is an attempt to rewrite Da Vinci's biography, in multiple dimensions, beyond the aura of myth and mystery, of legend and rhetoric, on the basis of autograph manuscripts and original documents. The book also presents a way to reconsider the interpretation of Da Vinci's work, his interdisciplinary complexity, his "universality" and "modernity".

In addition to the English and French translations, the book has been translated into Brazilian Portuguese, European Spanish, Japanese, Lithuanian, Polish, Romanian, Russian, South Korean, Swedish, Turkish, simplified and traditional Chinese. A new edition was released in 2010, an e-book for iPad came out in 2012, and a reprint for the Leonardo da Vinci exhibition at the Louvre Museum from 24 October 2019 to 24 February 2020.

== Contents ==
The book opens with a "trailer" (pp. 1–9), that is, a series of full-page drawings, paintings and mural made by Leonardo da Vinci. The body text is divided into five chapters:

- Chapter 1: "Once Upon a Time in Vinci" (pp. 13–23);
- Chapter 2: "In the Florence of the Medici" (pp. 25–49);
- Chapter 3: "In Milan in the Time of the Sforza" (pp. 51–81);
- Chapter 4: "Art and War" (pp. 83–103);
- Chapter 5: "Milan, Rome, Amboise" (pp. 105–127).

The second part of the book, the "Documents", containing a compilation of excerpts divided into five parts:

1. Portraits of a mysterious man (pp. 130–133);
2. Freud and Leonardo (pp. 134–135);
3. Leonardo in his own words (pp. 136–141);
4. Leonardo's science (pp. 142–145);
5. Leonardo in the modern age (pp. 146–149).
- Further Reading (pp. 150–151);
- List of Illustrations (pp. 151–156);
- Index (pp. 156–158).

== Reception ==
On Babelio, the book gets an average of 4.28/5 based on 9 ratings.

In The Irish Times, an anonymous author opines that "this little book is a useful summary".

== Adaptation ==
In 2001, the book was adapted into a documentary film by the title Léonard de Vinci. A co-production between La Sept-Arte and Trans Europe Film, with the collaboration of Éditions Gallimard and Louvre Museum, the film was directed by Jean-Claude Lubtchansky, with voice-over narration by French actors Aurore Clément and Gérard Desarthe. It was broadcast on Arte as part of the television programme The Human Adventure, and also released on DVD by Centre national du cinéma et de l'image animée (CNC). It has been dubbed into German under the title Leonardo da Vinci: Kunst und Wissenschaft des Universums, and into English, by the title Leonardo da Vinci: The Mind of the Renaissance.

== See also ==
- Renaissance man
- Renaissance art
- Renaissance science
