= Vinci, Tuscany =

Vinci
- Comune
- Comune di Vinci
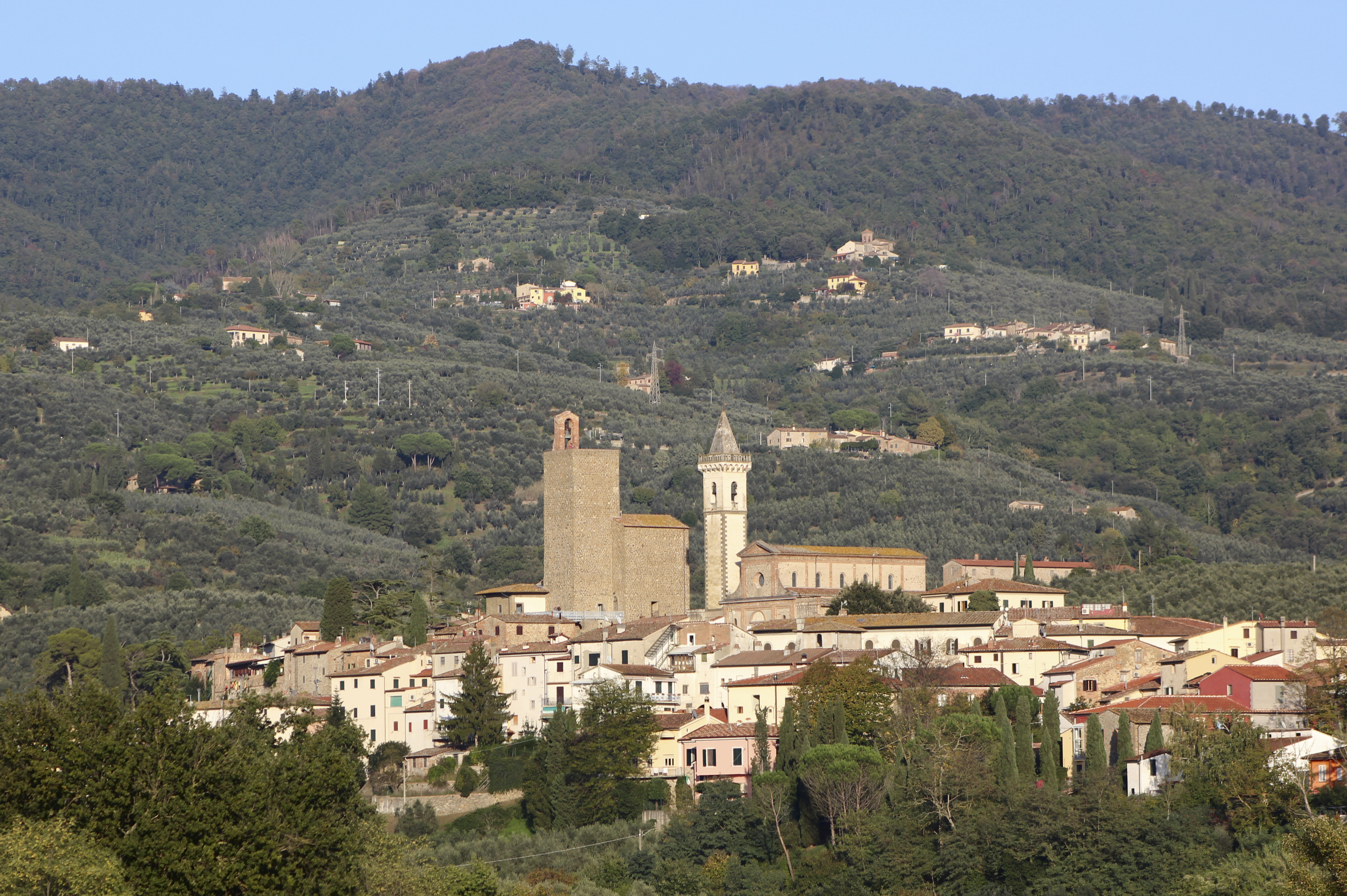
- Panorama of Vinci

- Coat of arms

- Location within Italy Location within Tuscany
- Coordinates: 43°47′03″N 10°55′29″E
- Country: Italy
- Region: Tuscany
- Metropolitan city: Florence (FI)
- Frazioni: Anchiano, Apparita, Badia a Passignano, Burrino, Collegonzi, Faltognano, La Stella, Mercatale, Orbignano, Petroio, Piccaratico, Salvino, San Donato, San Pantaleo, Santa Lucia, Sant'Amato, Sant'Ansano, Sovigliana, Spicchio, Toiano, Vitolini

Government
  - Mayor: Giuseppe Torchia

Area
  - Total: 54 km^{2} (21 sq mi)
- Elevation: 97 m (318 ft)

Population (30 November 2016)
  - Total: 14,579
  - Density: 270/km^{2} (700/sq mi)
- Demonym: Vinciani
- Time zone: UTC+1 (CET)
  - Summer (DST): UTC+2 (CEST)
- Postal code: 50059
- Dialing code: 0571
- ISTAT code: 048050
- Patron saint: St. Andrew
- Website: Official website

Vinci (English: /ˈvɪntʃi/ VIN-chee, Italian: [ˈvintʃi]) is a comune of the Metropolitan City of Florence in the Italian region of Tuscany. The birthplace of Leonardo da Vinci, a famous polymath of the Renaissance, lies just outside the town.

== Physical geography ==
Vinci is situated on the slopes of Montalbano, a hilly massif rich in vineyards and olive groves, characterized by terraces supported by distinctive dry stone walls.

The oldest part of Vinci has an almond-shaped layout, which is unusual for this area of Tuscany. Viewed from above, it resembles a two-masted boat (with the two masts being the tower of the Rocca dei Conti Guidi and the bell tower of the church of Santa Croce). For this reason, the historic center of Vinci is also known as “Castel della Nave” (Castle of the Ship).

- Seismic classification: zone 2 (medium-high seismicity), Ordinance PCM 3274 of 20/03/2003
- Climate classification: zone D, 1765 GG
- Atmospheric diffusivity: high, Ibimet CNR 2002

== Main sights ==
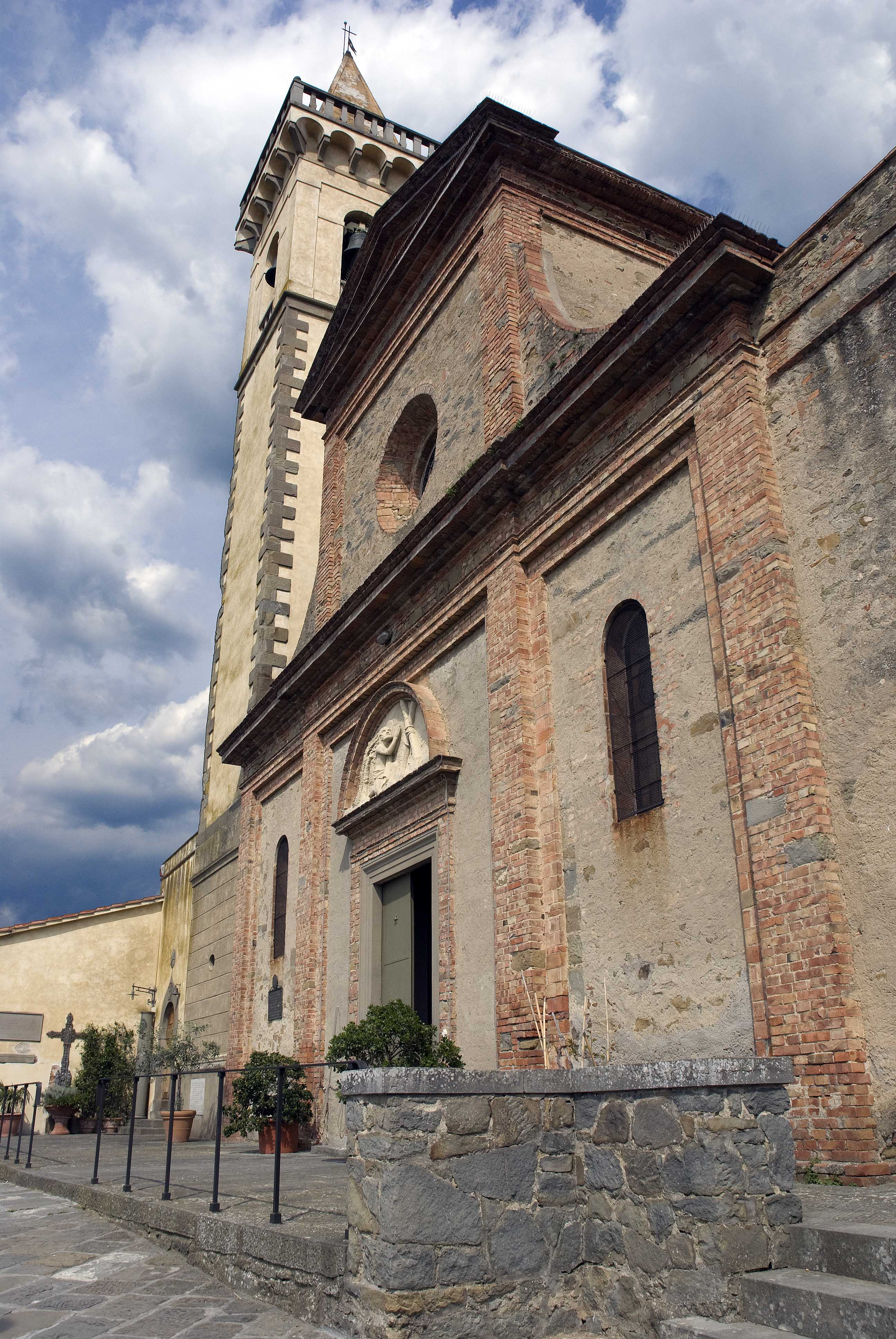
Church of Santa Croce

- Museo Leonardiano, museum of Leonardo da Vinci. This museum has displays of some of the inventions that are drawn in Leonardo's notebooks.
- Casa Natale di Leonardo, the birthplace of Leonardo da Vinci, situated approximately 3 km to the northeast of Vinci in the frazione of Anchiano. There are some reproductions of his drawings at the house.
- Church of Santa Croce, built in the 13th century but later remade in neo-Renaissance style.

== Twin towns ==
Vinci has two official sister cities as by Sister Cities International:

- Allentown, United States
- Amboise, France
