= Lita (given name) =

- Gender: Female
- Language: Latin

Origin
- Origin: Latin
- Meaning: "Gladly"

Other names
- Alternative spelling: Leta, Lida and Lata
- Derived: Originally a diminutive ending
- Related names: Alida, Carmel, Carmen, Elita

Lita is a female given name of Latin origin, which means "gladly". The name can be a diminutive form of Amelita, Elita, or Lolita.

== People ==
- Lita (wrestler) (born 1975), American wrestler
- Lita Albuquerque, American artist
- Lita Cabellut (born 1961), Spanish painter
- Lita Chevret (1908–2001), American actress
- Lita Cohen (born 1940), American politician
- Lita Ford (born 1958), American musician
- Lita Grey (1908–1995), American actress
- Lita Liem Sugiarto (born 1946), Indonesian tennis player
- Lita Prahl (1905–1978), Norwegian actress
- Lita Roza (1926–2008), British singer
- Lita Stantic (born 1942), Argentine filmmaker

== Fiction ==
- Lita, fictional character in the video game series Boktai
- Lita Kino, fictional character in the English adaptation of the Sailor Moon anime and manga series

== See also ==
- Lita (disambiguation)
- Lita (surname)
- Leta (given name)
- Lota (name)
