= Lyta (disambiguation) =

Lyta is a Nigerian singer and songwriter.

Lyta may also refer to

- Lyta Alexander, fictional character in the TV series Babylon 5
- Lyta Milton, a fictional character in DC Comics series
- Lyta Trevor or Lyta Hall, DC Comics superhero
- Lyta-Zod, a character in the TV series Krypton

== See also ==
- Lita (disambiguation)
