= Elita =

Elita may refer to:

- Elita (cigarette), a Latvian brand
- Elita (name), a list of people with the given name
- "Elita" (song), by Gary Barlow, Michael Bublé, and Sebastián Yatra, 2020
- Cyclone Elita, 2004
- Elita One or Elita, a female Transformer
- Elita (TV series), a Serbian reality TV show
- Elita (brachiopod), a brachiopod genus
- Elita (lingerie), a brand of lingerie

== See also ==
- Aelita
- Alita (disambiguation)
- Aleta (disambiguation)
