= Leta (given name) =

Leta is a feminine first name. Some notable women with the name include:

- Leta Andrews (born 1937), American basketball coach
- Leta Powell Drake (1938–2021), American broadcaster
- Leta Hong Fincher, American journalist
- Leta Stetter Hollingsworth (1886–1939), American psychologist
- Leta Lindley (born 1972), American golfer
- Leta Peer (1964–2012), Swiss artist
- Leta Myers Smart (1894–1981), Native American (Omaha) writer and activist

== See also ==
- Lita (given name)
- Leda
