= Timotheus (sculptor) =

Greek sculptor of the 4th century BC

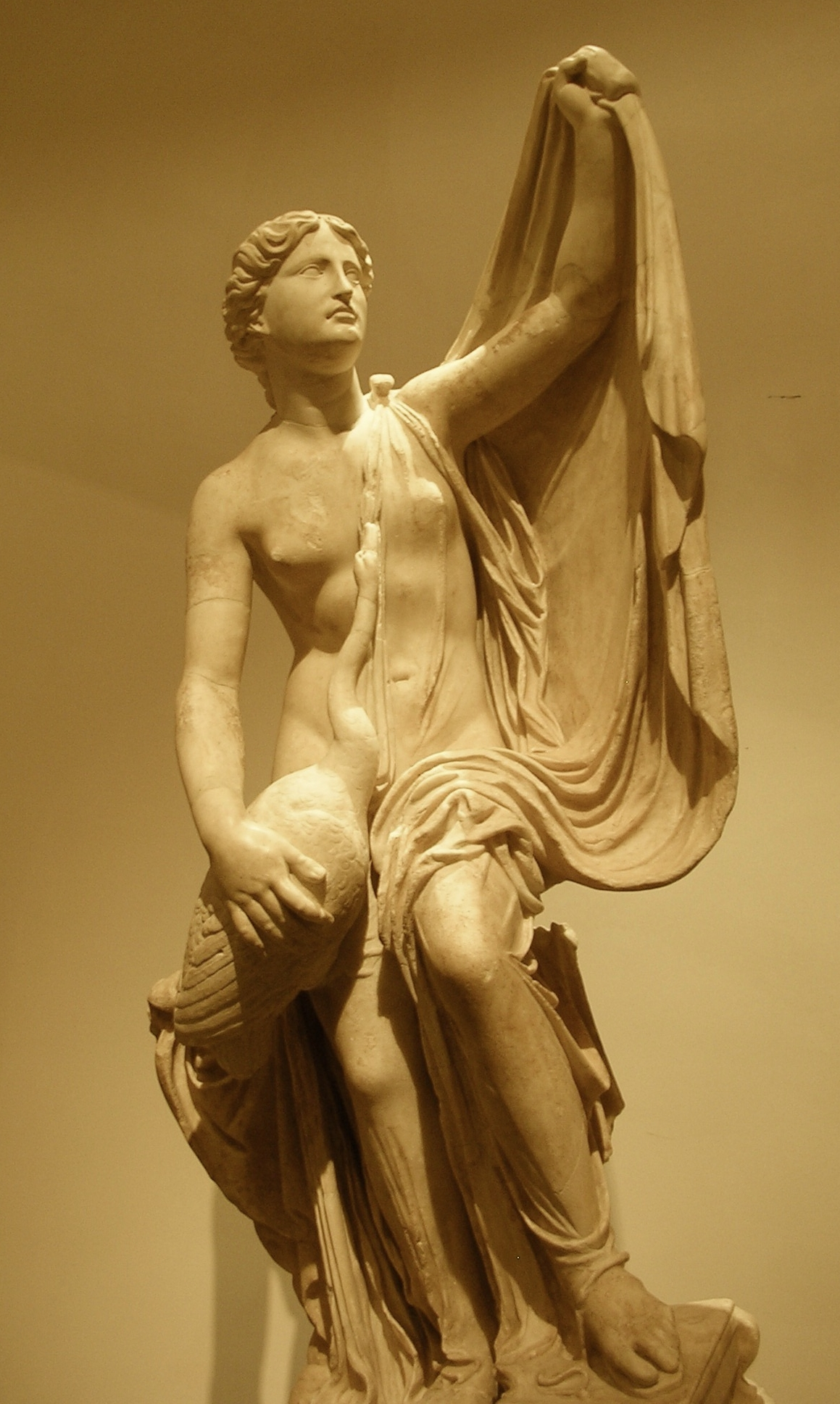
Roman marble of Leda and the Swan (Prado)

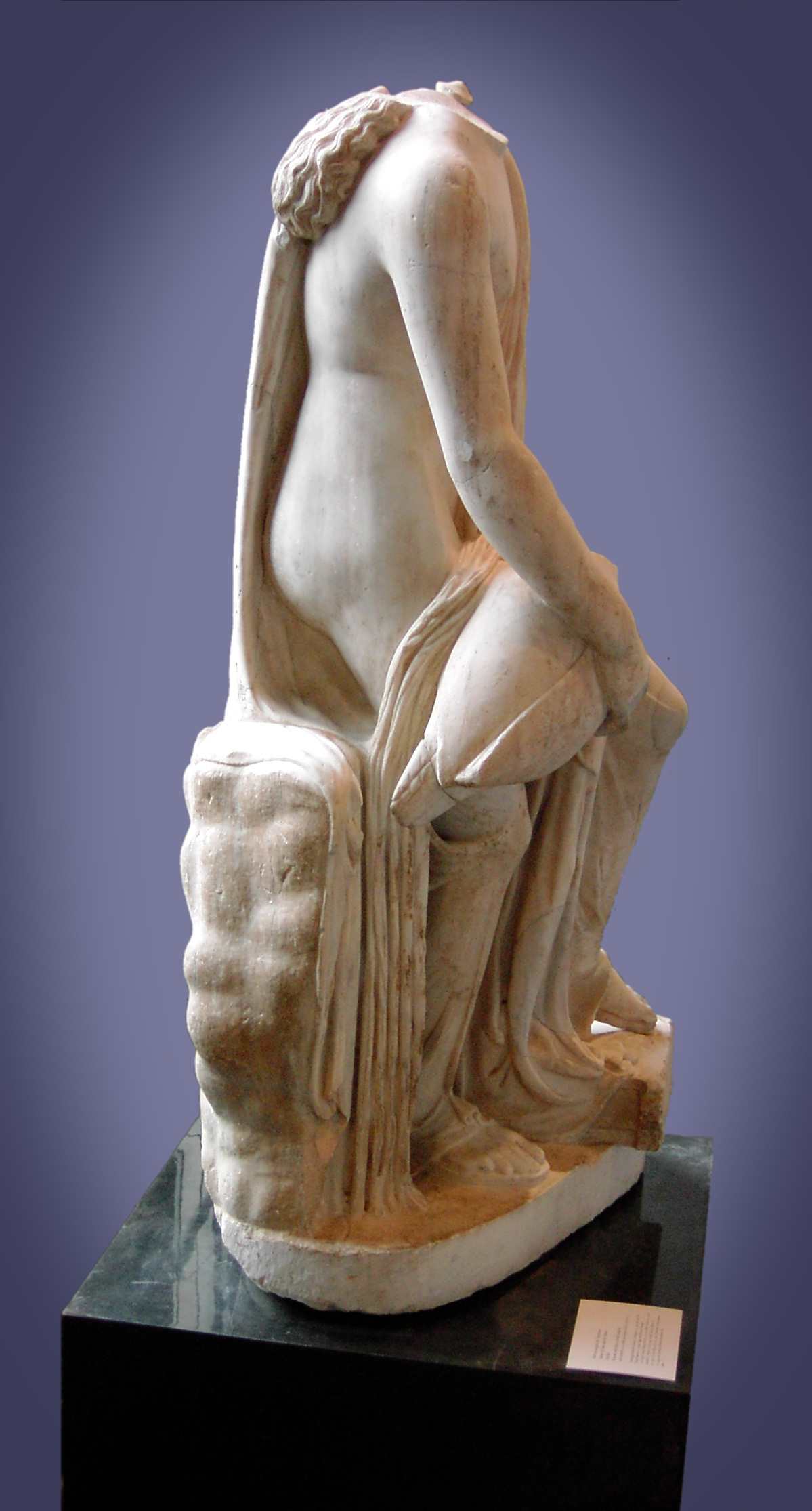
Leda and the Swan (Yale University Art Gallery)

Timotheus (Greek: Τιμόθεος; born in Epidaurus; died in Epidaurus, c. 340 BC) was a Greek sculptor of the 4th century BC, one of the rivals and contemporaries of Scopas of Paros, among the sculptors who worked for their own fame on the construction of the Mausoleum at Halicarnassus between 353 and 350 BC. He was apparently the leading sculptor at the Temple of Asclepius at Epidaurus, c. 380 BC.

To him is attributed a sculpture of Leda and the Swan in which the queen Leda of Sparta protected a swan from an eagle, on the basis of which a Roman marble copy in the Capitoline Museums is said to be "after Timotheus". The theme must have been popular, judging by the more than two dozen Roman marble copies that survive. The most famous version has been that in the Capitoline Museums in Rome, purchased by Pope Clement XIV from the heirs of Cardinal Alessandro Albani. A highly restored version is in the Museo del Prado, and an incomplete one is in the Yale University Art Gallery, New Haven, Connecticut.
