= Leta =

Leta may refer to:

- LETA, a Latvian news agency
- Leta (given name)

== See also ==
- Leto, in Greek mythology, a daughter of the Titans Coeus and Phoebe
- Lake Letas, the largest lake in Vanuatu
