= Aelita (novel) =

1923 novel by Aleksey Nikolayevich Tolstoy

- Author: Alexei Tolstoy
- Original title: Аэлита
- Translator: Lucy Flaxman
- Language: Russian
- Genre: Science fiction
- Publisher: Foreign Languages Publishing House
- Publication date: 1923
- Publication place: Soviet Union
- English publication date: 1950
- Media type: Print (Hardcover)

Aelita (Russian: Аэлита) also known as Aelita, or The Decline of Mars is a 1923 science fiction novel by Russian author Aleksey Tolstoy.

In 1935–1938 the author considerably reworked it into a novel suitable for children and young adults, published in 1938 by Detizdat, "School Library" series.

== Plot summary ==
The story begins in the Soviet Union, just after the end of the Russian Civil War. An engineer Mstislav Sergeyevich Los', designs and constructs a revolutionary pulse detonation rocket and decides to set course for Mars. Looking for a companion for the travel, he finally leaves Earth with a retired soldier, Aleksei Gusev.

Arriving on Mars, they discover that the planet is inhabited by an advanced civilization. However, the gap between the ruling class and the workers is very strong and reminiscent of early capitalism, with workers living in underground corridors near their machines.

Later in the novel, it is explained that Martians are descendants of both local races and of Atlanteans who came there after the sinking of their home continent (here Tolstoy was inspired by Helena Blavatsky's books). Mars is now ruled by Engineers but all is not well. While speaking before an assembly, their leader, Toscoob, says that the city must be destroyed to ease the fall of Mars. Aelita, Toscoob's beautiful daughter and the princess of Mars, later reveals to Los' that the planet is dying, that the polar ice caps are not melting as they once did and the planet is facing an environmental catastrophe.

While the adventurous Gusev takes the lead of a popular uprising against the ruler, the more intellectual Los' becomes enamored with Aelita. When the rebellion is crushed, Gusev and Los' are forced to flee Mars and eventually make it back to Earth. The trip is prolonged with the effects of high speed and time dilation resulting in a loss of over three years. The exact fate of Aelita herself is unknown. It is hinted that she actually survived, since Los' receives radio messages from Mars mentioning his name.

== Adaptations ==
The novel was adapted in the Soviet Union to silent film under the same title shot by Yakov Protazanov in 1924, and by Hungarian director András Rajnai in 1980. Andrija Maurović (artist) and Krešimir Kovačić (writer) in Yugoslavia adapted it into a comic, published 1935–1936, titled Ljubavnica s Marsa (Mistress from Mars).

== English releases ==
1. Tolstoy, Aleksey Nikolayevich. Aelita translated by Lucy Flaxman. Moscow: Foreign Languages Publishing House, 1950, 276 pp. LCCN 5903-7312.
2. Tolstoy, Alexei N. Aelita translated by Antonina W. Bouis; introduction by Theodore Sturgeon. New York: Macmillan, 1981, 167 pp. ISBN 978-0-02-619200-2. LCCN 8100-2185.
3. Tolstoi, Alexei. Aelita or The Decline of Mars new translation by Leland Fetzer. Ann Arbor: Ardis, August, 1985, 176 pp. ISBN 978-0-88233-788-3. LCCN 8500-7437.
4. Tolstoy, Alexei (2001). Aelita. Amsterdam, the Netherlands: Fredonia Books. ISBN 978-1-58963-374-2.

== See also ==
- Aelita for things named after Aelita
