= Cornelis Bos =

Flemish engraver, printseller and publisher

- Born: c. 1508; Den Bosch
- Died: 1555; Groningen

Cornelis Bos or Bossche (c. 1506/10 – before 7 May 1555) was a Flemish engraver, printseller and book publisher, known for his accurate engravings of Italian works. His work is often signed with the monogram C-B.

== Biography ==
He was born at 's Hertogenbosch, whence his surname Bos is derived, and is registered there until 1537, but he was in Antwerp by 1 April 1541 when he was granted citizenship of that city and membership in the Guild of St. Luke. There has been some speculation that he took a trip to Italy in the intervening years, but this is not certain.

His earliest identified engravings reproduce Maarten van Heemskerck's Prudence and Justice (1537), and a work by Agostino Veneziano. His re-engraving of work by Marcantonio Raimondi does not necessarily indicate that he ever made a trip to Rome. Until 1544 Bos worked in Antwerp as an engraver, commissioned by publishers in the city's extensive book trade for illustrations in books. His engravings, copied from the published engravings in Italian editions, served as illustrations for a brief summary in Dutch of the treaty on architecture by Vitruvius and for a Dutch translation of Book IV of Sebastiano Serlio's architectural treatise, both published by Pieter Coecke van Aelst. Bos' engravings illustrate a text on anatomy that he produced in 1542 by the printer and publisher Antoine de Goys.

In the summer of 1544 Bos was forced to flee Antwerp for his participation in an antisacerdotalist free-thinking spiritualist sect and was declared exiled by the Council of Brabant in his absence. It appears that he went to Paris, where an anatomical work published by Jérôme de Gourmont in 1545 repeats text used by Cornelis Bos and even makes use of the woodblocks formerly in his possession. Between 1546 and 1548, from his secure refuge in Nuremberg, Cornelis Bos would publish more than a hundred engraved designs of strapwork and grotesques. Bos also produced popular engravings of religious and allegorical subjects, often dependent for their composition upon the Kleinmeisters of Nuremberg, with many parallels in the output of Virgil Solis.

Bos moved to Groningen, where he is registered as having sold paper to the city magistrate 2 December 1548. He was granted citizenship there in 1550. His first wife Lijnken van Dort or van den Bos, with whom he had five children, was deceased by then and he remarried Alijdt, who came from a local family. The couple had two children. A document of 7 Mai 1555 refers to him as deceased. An inventory of his workshop and other possessions, taken 3 August 1544, which included two printing presses, and the auction of his property 3 January 1545, have been mined by historians of printmaking.

== Works ==
- Laocoön and His Sons,
- A decorative patternbook published by Jérôme de Gourmont, Livre de moresques (1546) was a pirated edition of a work published in Antwerp by Bos in 1530; it served designers of mannerist scrollwork (bandelwerk) in the Low Countries.
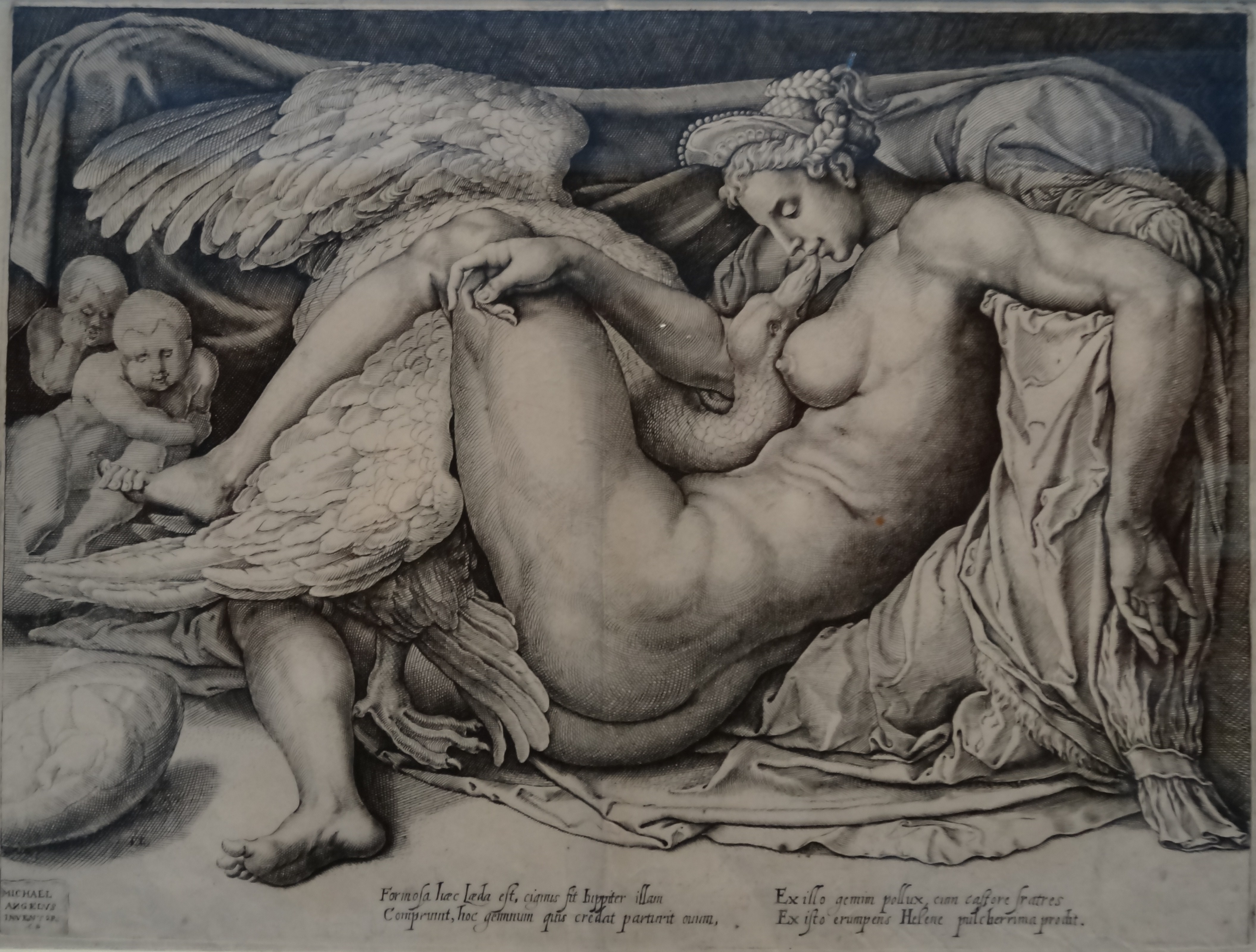
Engraving after a lost work by Michelangelo of Leda and the Swan

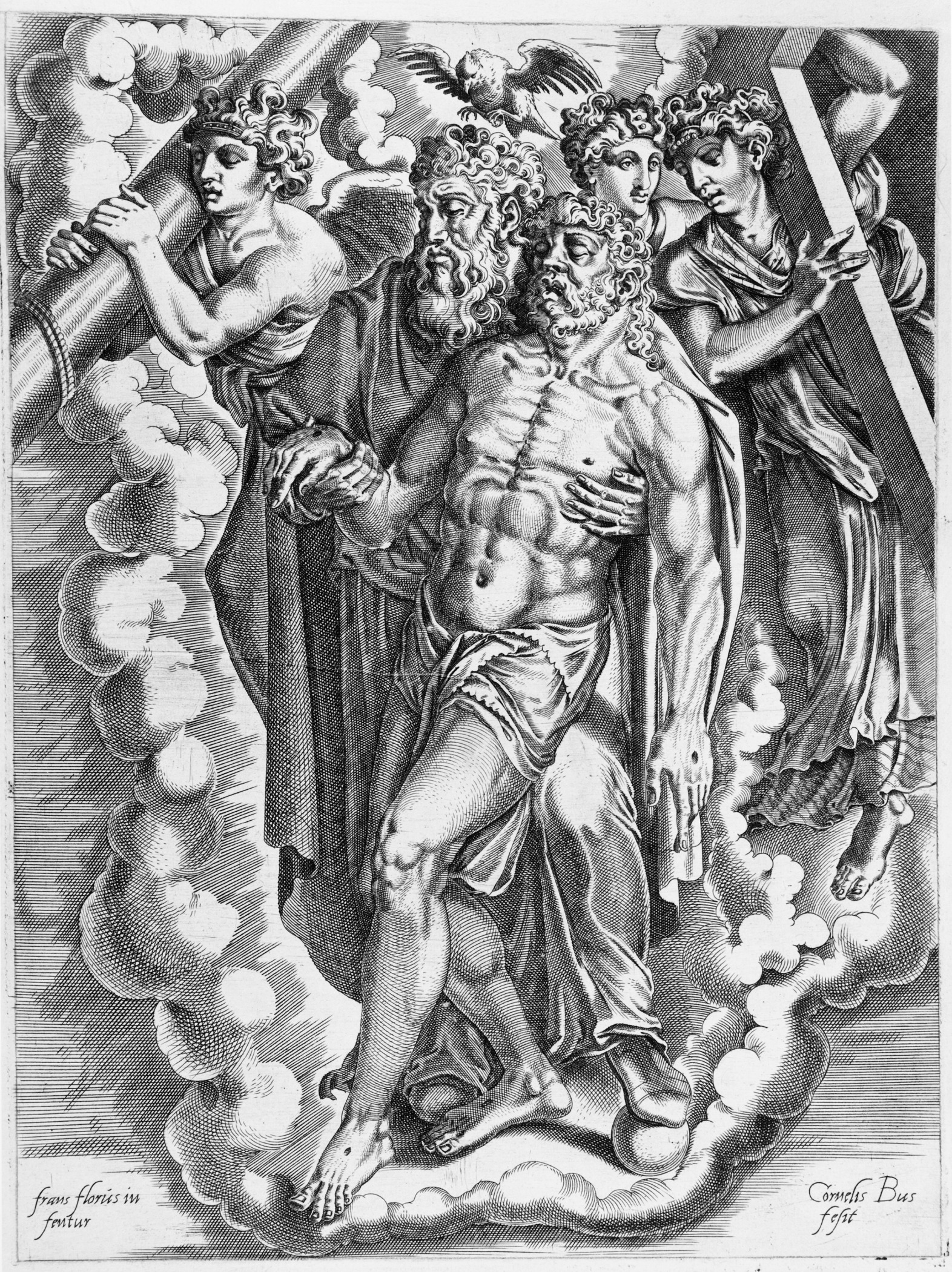
The Holy Trinity
