= Elita (name) =

Elita is a given name. Notable people with the name include:

- Elita Karim (born 1982), Bangladeshi singer and journalist
- Elita Kļaviņa (born 1966), Latvian actress
- Elita Krūmiņa (born 1965), Latvian government official
- Elita Löfblad (born 1980), Chilean-born Swedish model and reality show contestant
- Elita Loresca (born 1977), Filipino-American newscaster
- Elita Proctor Otis (1851 or 1860–1927), American actress
- Elita Veidemane (born 1955), Latvian journalist and publicist

== See also ==
- Alita (disambiguation)
