= Genieve Figgis =

Irish painter (born 1972)

- Born: Dublin, Ireland
- Education: Gorey School of Art, National College of Art and Design Dublin
- Known for: Painting
- Website: genievefiggis.com

Genieve Figgis (born 1972) is an Irish painter who started her artistic career using social media. She is known for her vibrant colors and ghoulish or macabre imagery. According to Flaunt magazine: "Her unique brand of painting—which uses acrylics "slathered heavily" on canvas and often references works of the canon as viewed through a melted macabre filter—is at once classical and utterly contemporary."

== Education ==
Figgis graduated in 2006 from the Gorey School of Art in Wexford with a Bachelor's in Fine Arts. She completed her studies in 2012 with a Master's of Fine Arts at the National College of Art and Design in Dublin, Ireland.

Olivia Parkes wrote, "An unconventional rising art star, she started her family before she started art school, and received recognition for her work online before the gallery world caught up. It's the kind of story that makes you love the internet: for bringing us the good stuff, faster than we would have gotten it otherwise."

Figgis' use of Twitter to display her artwork in 2014 caught the attention of American artist Richard Prince and introduced Figgis into the New York art scene. Figgis made her American debut exhibition at Harpers Books in East Hampton, New York in the summer of 2014 while also publishing her first book at the same time titled Making Love With the Devil.

Since 2015, she is represented by Almine Rech Gallery. In 2026, her work was included in the group exhibition Songs to the Siren at The Model in Sligo, curated by Paul Hallahan and Lee Welch.

== Style ==
From the outset, Figgis has played with the culture of upper class luxury culture portrayed in the art canon by artists such as Diego Velázquez, Francisco Goya, Fragonard, Édouard Manet, Henri de Toulouse-Lautrec, James Ensor and François Boucher. Figgis' style strikes a balance between figuration and abstraction. Her paintings are reminiscent of 18th century Rococo style as she recreates cheery Victorian photographs, and paintings with thick paint, causing the subjects to appear as melting, zombie-like creatures.

Figgis values the use of paint for its ability to surprise, and is the medium she uses to form her figures of drips and swirls giving them a ghoulish imagery in her paintings. Her paintings technique involves dripping paint onto a canvas allowing gravity and colour-bleeding along to do most of the work with subtle surface marks to create specific details and textures.

She cites Marlene Dumas, Cecily Brown and Jenny Saville as her heroes. Her work has been influenced by growing up in Ireland with the rules of the Catholic Church and the scenic countryside she is surrounded by in her everyday life, living in County Wicklow. Figgis believes having a knowledge of a Spirit and becoming one with nature allows one to become more connected with the Earth's energy. This expression of spiritual beliefs can be seen through her works with her use of rich colors that "bubble, ooze and marbleize as if alive."

Genieve Figgis, Leda and the Swan (after Boucher), 2018, Acrylic on canvas, 23 x 31 inches

Figgis painted a version of Leda and the Swan in 2018 after an earlier work by François Boucher. Figgis' contemporary version reinvents an idyllic romantic scene of lavish playfulness with dark humor, transforming it into one of profanity and horror.
