= Leda and the Swan =

Theme from Greek mythology

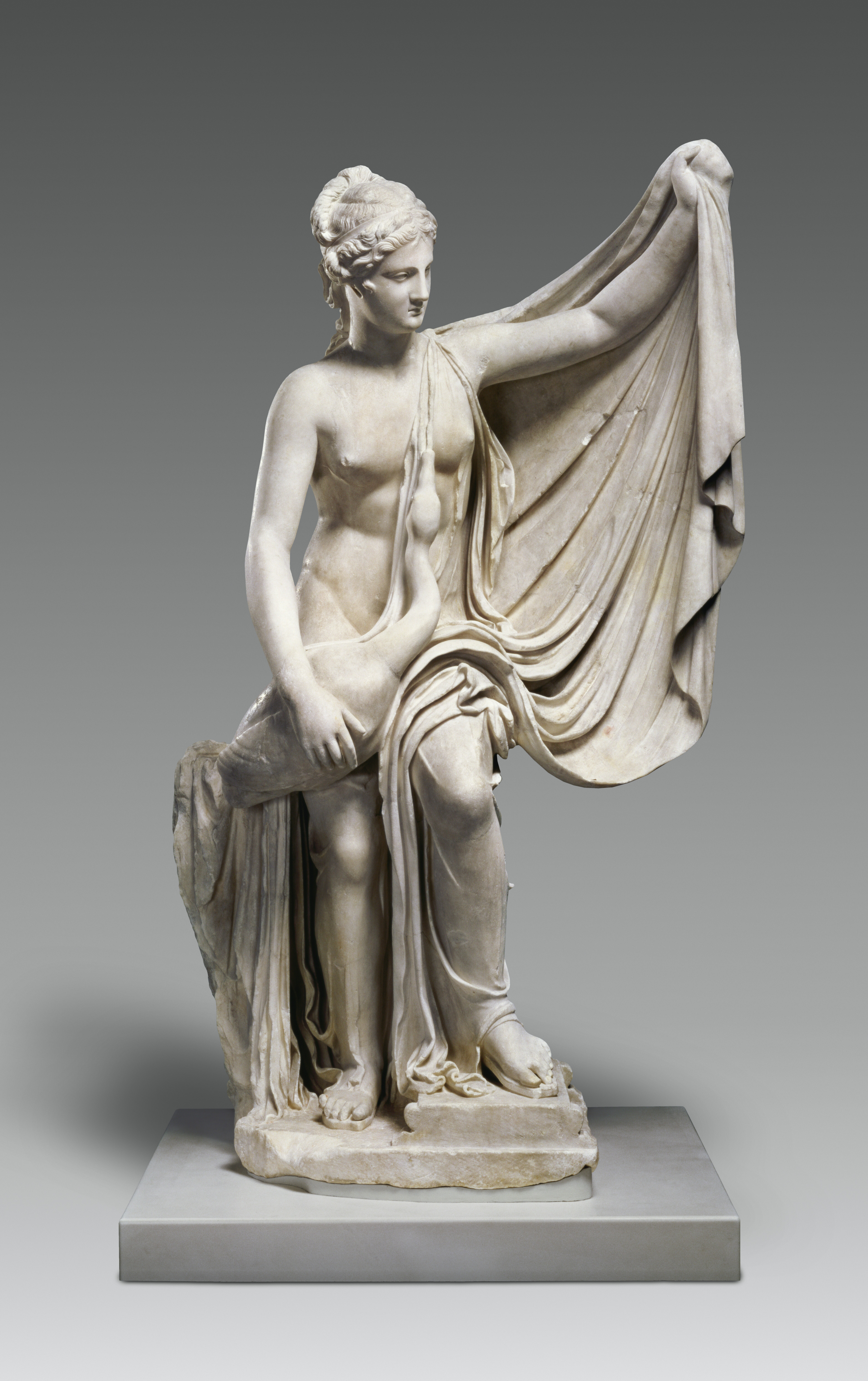
"...this statue is a first-century Roman version of an earlier Greek statue from the 300s B.C. attributed to Timotheos. More than two dozen examples of this statue survive, attesting to the theme's popularity among the Romans. ...Both arms, most of the outstretched cloak, the swan's head, and the folds of cloth between Leda's legs are eighteenth-century restorations. The head, though ancient, is not original to this work, but comes from a statue of Venus". Marble. Getty Villa

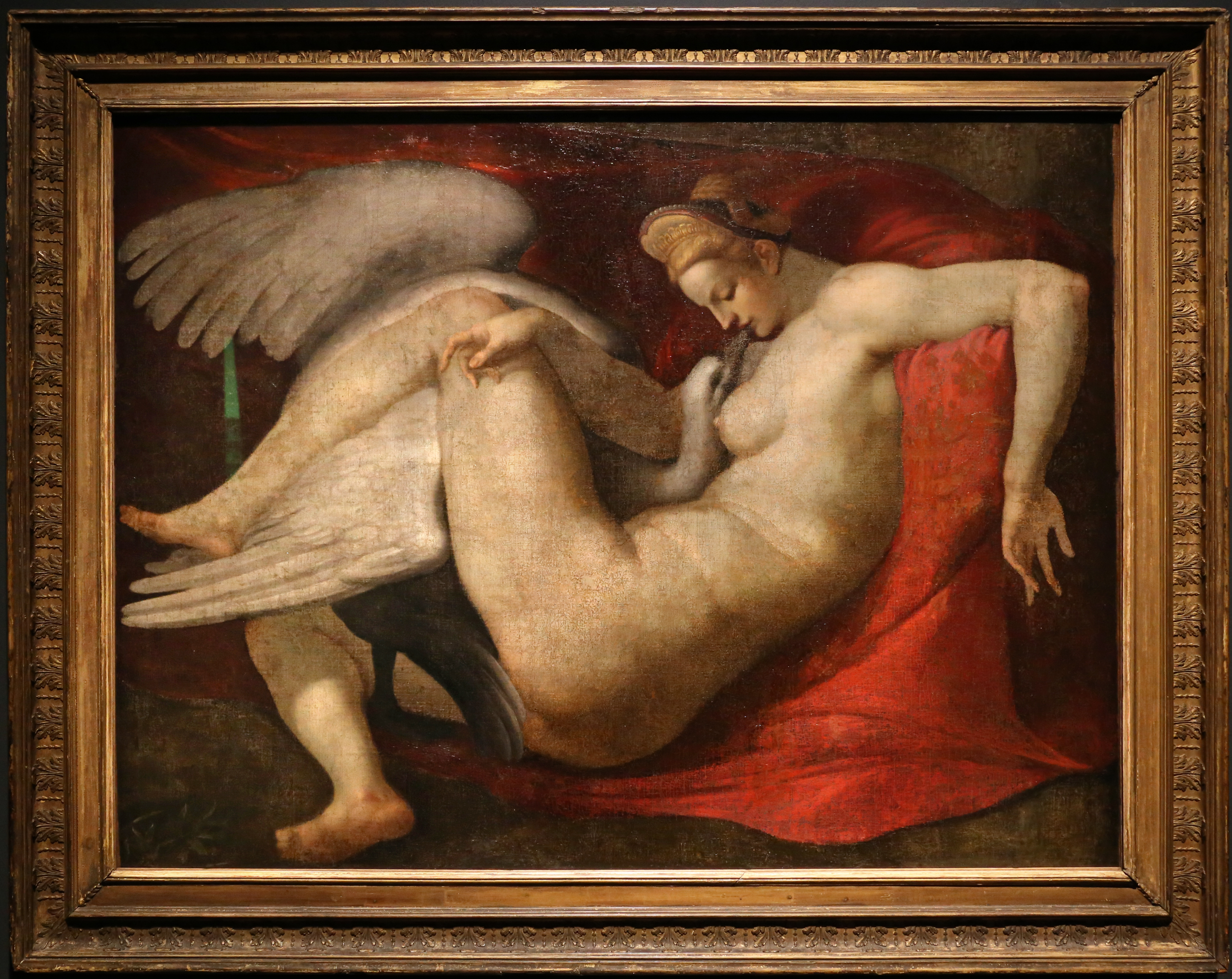
Leda and the Swan, a 16th-century copy after a lost painting by Michelangelo (National Gallery, London)

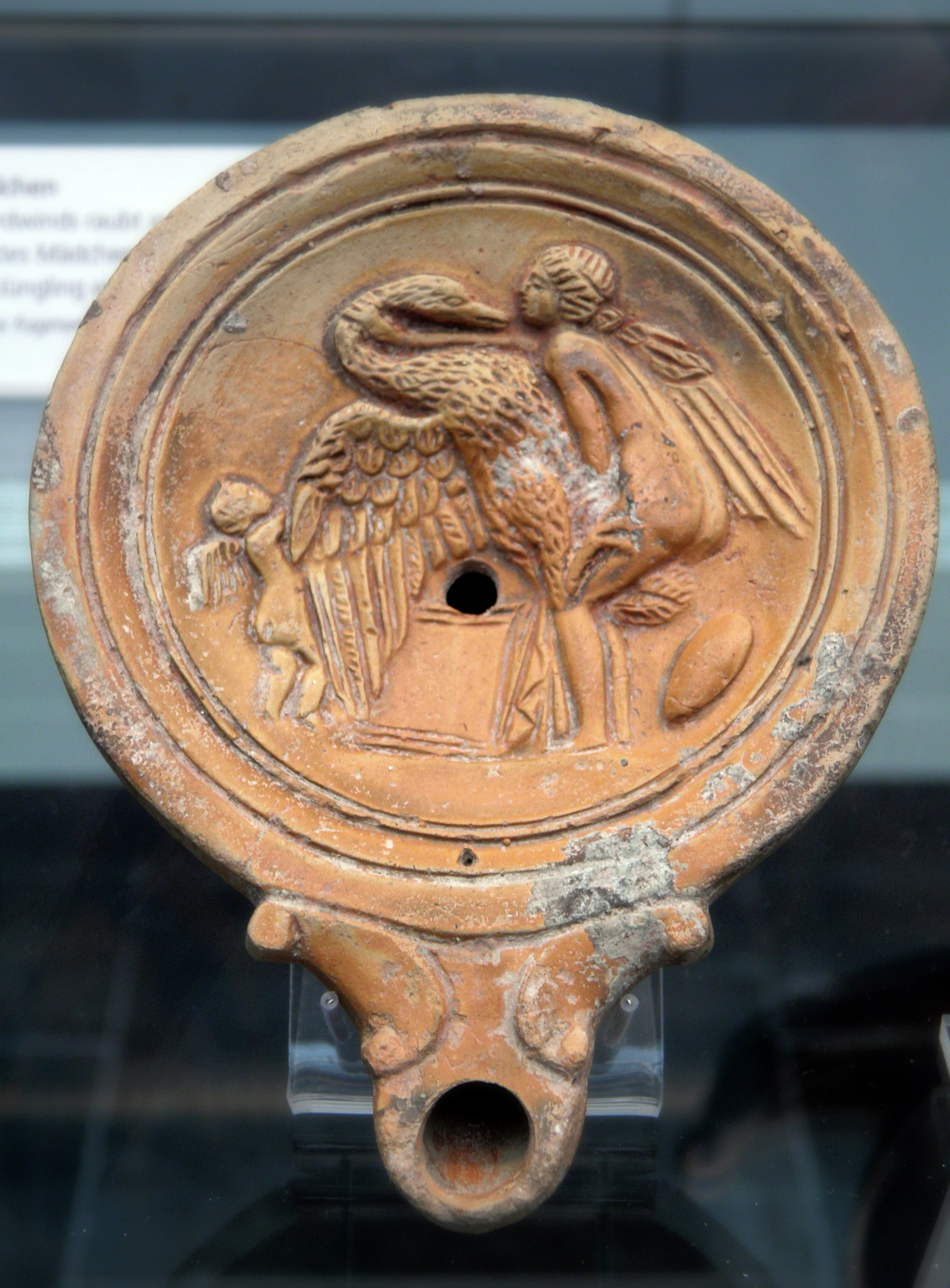
Roman oil lamp, 1st century AD

Leda and the Swan is a story and subject in art from Greek mythology in which the god Zeus, in the form of a swan, seduces Leda, an Aetolian princess who became Spartan queen. According to later Greek mythology, Leda bore Helen and Polydeuces, children of Zeus, while at the same time bearing Castor and Clytemnestra, children of her husband Tyndareus, the King of Sparta. According to many versions of the story, Zeus took the form of a swan and slept with Leda on the same night she slept with her husband King Tyndareus. In some versions, she laid two eggs from which the children hatched. In other versions, Helen is a daughter of Nemesis, the goddess who personified the disaster that awaited those suffering from the pride of Hubris.

Especially in art, the degree of consent by Leda to the relationship seems to vary considerably; there are numerous depictions, for example by Leonardo da Vinci, that show Leda affectionately embracing the swan, as their children play.

The subject was rarely seen in the large-scale sculpture of antiquity, although a representation of Leda in sculpture has been attributed in modern times to Timotheus (compare illustration, below left); small-scale sculptures survive showing both reclining and standing poses, in cameos and engraved gems, rings, and terracotta oil lamps. Thanks to the literary renditions of Ovid and Fulgentius, it was a well-known myth through the Middle Ages, but emerged more prominently as a classicizing theme with erotic overtones in the Italian Renaissance.

== Eroticism ==
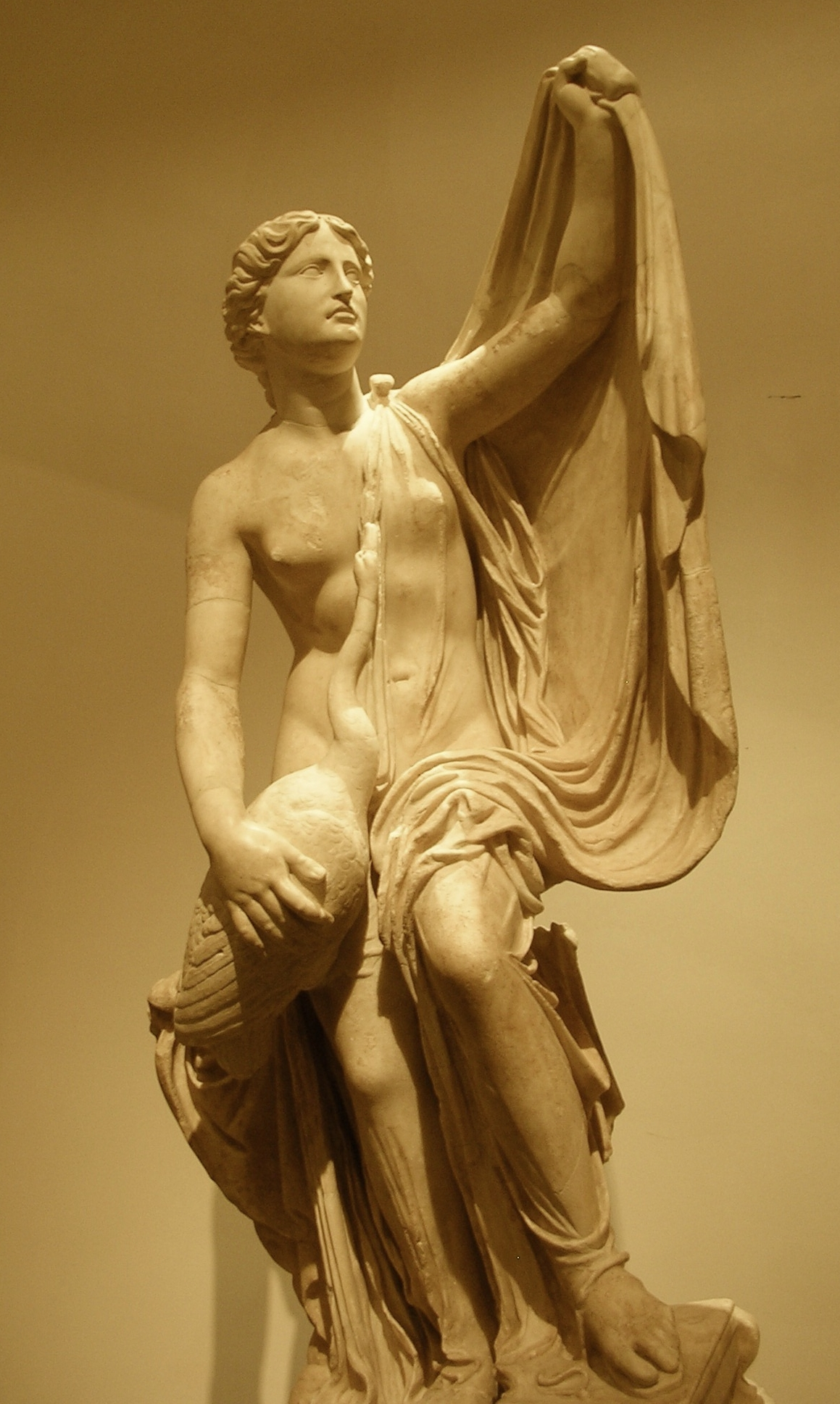
Leda and the Swan, Roman marble possibly reflecting a lost work by Timotheos from the 300s BCE. More than two dozen examples of this statue survive. restored (Prado)

The historian Procopius claims, in his Secret History, that the Roman Empress Theodora acted in a reproduction of this particular myth at some point in her youth in the early sixth century CE prior to her becoming the empress. This account is heavily disputed for the biases Roman aristocrats including Procopius had towards the role of women and the reputation of actresses and sex workers at the time.

The subject undoubtedly owed its 16th-century popularity to the paradox that it was considered more acceptable to depict a woman in the act of copulation with a swan than with a man. The earliest depictions show the pair love-making with some explicitness—more so than in any depictions of a human pair made by artists of high quality in the same period.

The fate of the erotic album I Modi some years later shows why this was so. The theme remained a dangerous one in the Renaissance, as the fates of the three best known paintings on the subject demonstrate. The earliest depictions were all in the more private medium of the old master print, and mostly from Venice. They were often based on the extremely brief account in the Metamorphoses of Ovid (who does not imply a rape), though Lorenzo de' Medici had both a Roman sarcophagus and an antique carved gem of the subject, both with reclining Ledas.

The earliest known explicit Renaissance depiction is one of the many woodcut illustrations to Hypnerotomachia Poliphili, a book published in Venice in 1499. This shows Leda and the Swan making love with gusto, despite being on top of a triumphal car, being pulled along and surrounded by a considerable crowd. An engraving dating to 1503 at the latest, by Giovanni Battista Palumba, also shows the couple in coitus, but in deserted countryside. Another engraving, certainly from Venice and attributed by many to Giulio Campagnola, shows a love-making scene, but there Leda's attitude is highly ambiguous. Palumba made another engraving, perhaps in about 1512, presumably influenced by Leonardo's sketches for his earlier composition, showing Leda seated on the ground and playing with her children.

There were also significant depictions in the smaller decorative arts, also private media. Benvenuto Cellini made a medallion, now in Vienna, early in his career, and Antonio Abondio one on the obverse of a medal celebrating a Roman courtesan.

== In painting ==
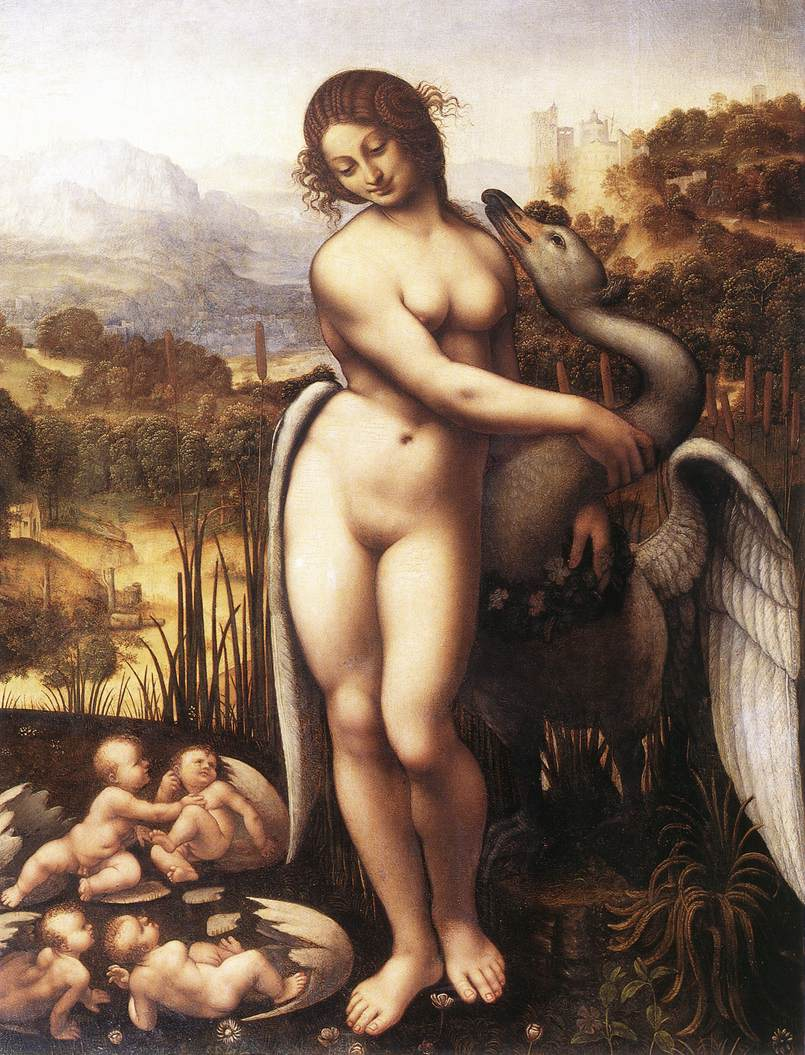
Leda and the Swan, copy by Cesare da Sesto after a lost original by Leonardo, 1515–1520, Oil on canvas, Wilton House, England.

A fresco depicting the Greek myth of Leda and the Swan was unearthed at the Pompeii archaeological site in 2018. Another fresco commonly attributed to the Leda and the Swan motif was found in the House of the Citarist (I.4.5/25), and is now housed in the Naples Archaeological Museum (MANN inv. 120034). It dates to the first century CE.

Leonardo da Vinci began making studies in 1504 for a painting, apparently never executed, of Leda seated on the ground with her children. In 1508, he painted a different composition of the subject, with a nude standing Leda cuddling the Swan, with the two sets of infant twins (also nude), and their huge broken egg-shells. The original of this is lost, possibly deliberately destroyed, and was last recorded in the French royal Château de Fontainebleau in 1625 by Cassiano dal Pozzo. However it is known from many copies, of which the earliest are probably the Spiridon Leda, perhaps by a studio assistant and now in the Uffizi, and the one at Wilton House in the United Kingdom (illustrated).

Also lost, and probably deliberately destroyed, is Michelangelo's tempera painting of the pair making love, commissioned in 1529 by Alfonso d'Este for his palazzo in Ferrara, and taken to France for the royal collection in 1532; it was at Fontainebleau in 1536. Michelangelo's cartoon for the work—given to his assistant Antonio Mini, who used it for several copies for French patrons before his death in 1533—survived for over a century. This composition is known from many copies, including an ambitious engraving by Cornelis Bos, c. 1563; the marble sculpture by Bartolomeo Ammanati in the Bargello, Florence; two copies by the young Rubens on his Italian voyage, and the painting after Michelangelo, ca. 1530, in the National Gallery, London. The Michelangelo composition, of about 1530, shows Mannerist tendencies of elongation and twisted pose (the figura serpentinata) that were popular at the time. In addition, a sculptural group, similar to the Prado Roman group illustrated, was believed until at least the 19th century to be by Michelangelo.

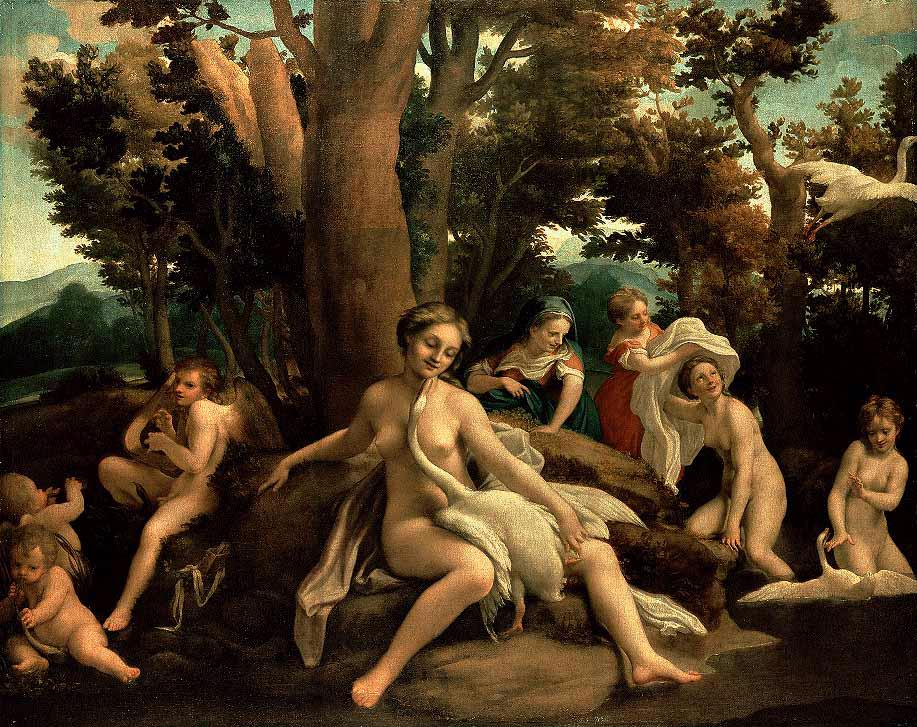
Leda and the Swan by Correggio

The last very famous Renaissance painting of the subject is Correggio's elaborate composition of c. 1530 (Berlin); this too was damaged whilst in the collection of Philippe II, Duke of Orléans, the Regent of France in the minority of Louis XV. His son Louis, though a great lover of painting, had periodic crises of conscience about his way of life, in one of which he attacked the figure of Leda with a knife. The damage has been repaired, though full restoration to the original condition was not possible. Both the Leonardo and Michelangelo paintings also disappeared when in the collection of the French Royal Family, and are believed to have been destroyed by more moralistic widows or successors of their owners.

There were many other depictions in the Renaissance, including cycles of book illustrations to Ovid, but most were derivative of the compositions mentioned above. The subject remained largely confined to Italy, and sometimes France—Northern versions are rare. After something of a hiatus in the 18th and early 19th centuries (apart from a very sensuous Boucher), Leda and the Swan became again a popular motif in the later 19th and 20th centuries, with many Symbolist and Expressionist treatments. Gustav Klimt painted the subject of Leda with the Swan in 1917, however this work was destroyed in the fire at Schloss Immendorf in 1945.

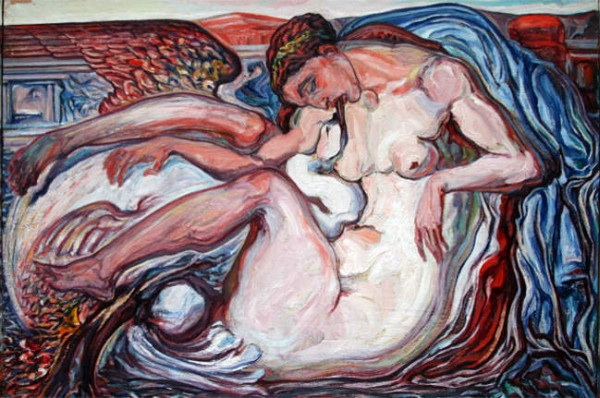
Oleksa Novakivskyi's Leda and the Swan, Ukraine

Also from that era were sculptures of the theme by Antonin Mercié and Max Klinger.

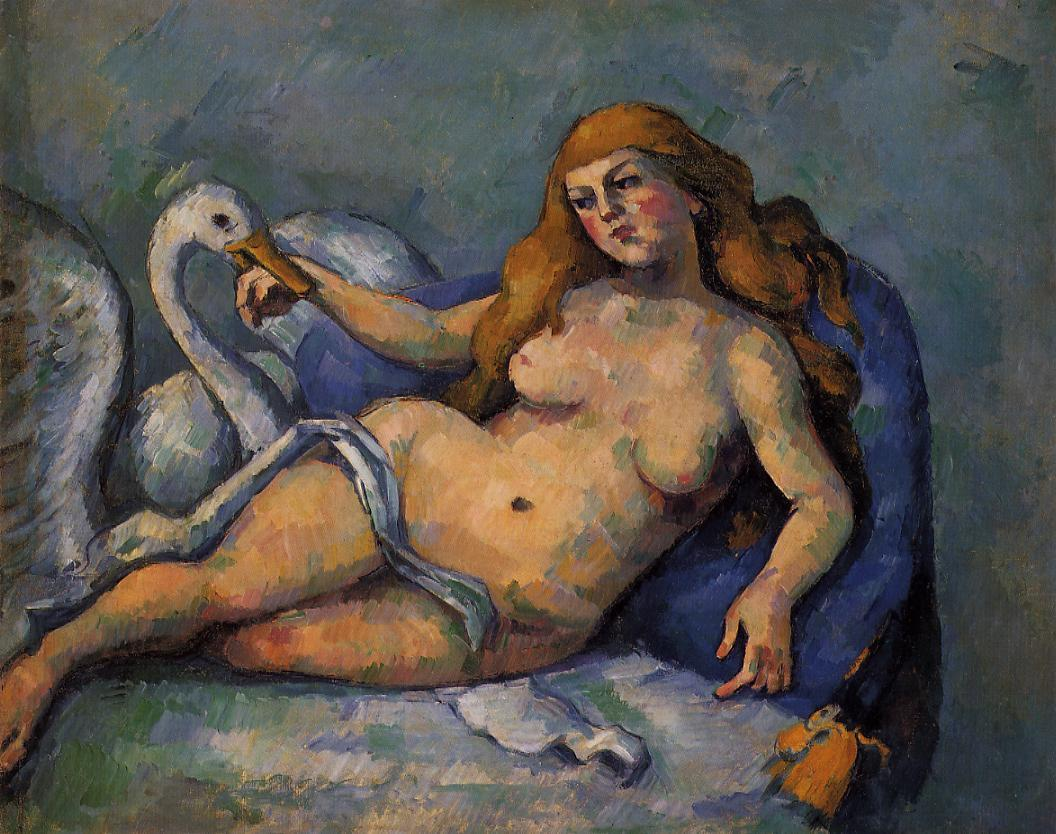
Paul Cézanne's Leda and the Swan

== In modern and contemporary art ==
Cy Twombly executed an abstract version of Leda and the Swan in 1962. It was purchased by Larry Gagosian for $52.9 million at Christie's May 2017 Post-War and Contemporary Art Evening Sale.

Avant-garde filmmaker Kurt Kren along with other members of the Viennese Actionist movement, including Otto Muehl and Hermann Nitsch, made a film-performance called 7/64 Leda und der Schwan in 1964. The film retains the classical motif, portraying, for most of its duration, a young woman embracing a swan.

There is a life-sized marble statue of Leda and the Swan at the Jai Vilas Palace Museum in Gwalior, Northern Madhya Pradesh, India.

American artist and photographer Carole Harmel created the "Bird" series (1983), a Jean Cocteau-influenced collection of photographs that explored the "Leda and the Swan" myth in tightly cropped, voyeuristic images of a nude female and an undefinable birdlike creature hinting at intimacy.

Bristol Museum and Art Gallery currently exhibits Karl Weschke's Leda and the Swan, painted in 1986. The Winnipeg Art Gallery in Canada has, in its permanent collection, a ceramic "Leda and the Swan" by Japanese-born American artist Akio Takamori. Genieve Figgis painted her version of Leda and the Swan in 2018 after an earlier work by François Boucher. Figgis’ contemporary version reinvents the idyllic romantic scene of lavish playfulness with a dark humor creating a scene of profanity and horror. There is a sculpture in neon lights depicting Leda and the Swan in Berlin, near Sonnenallee metro station and the Estrel hotel, designed by AES+F. Photographer Charlie White included a portrait of Leda in his "And Jeopardize the Integrity of the Hull" series. Zeus, as the swan, only appears metaphorically.

== In poetry ==
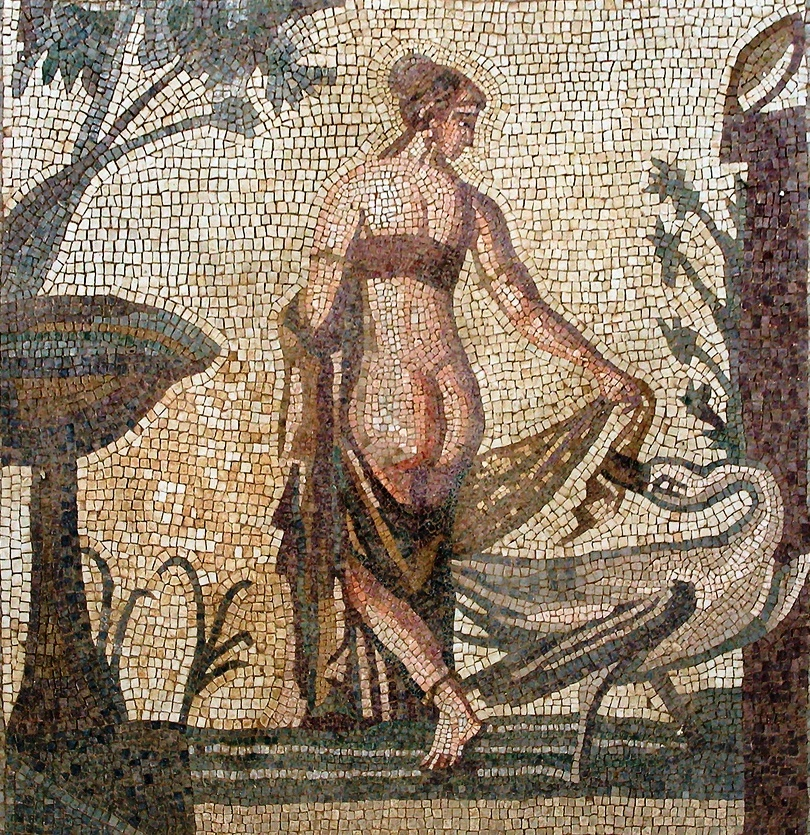
A mosaic from the Sanctuary of Aphrodite, Palea Paphos Cyprus. Cyprus Museum, Nicosia. Around 3rd century AD

Ronsard wrote a poem on La Défloration de Lède, perhaps inspired by the Michelangelo, which he may well have known. He imagines the beak going into Leda's mouth.

"Leda and the Swan" is a sonnet by William Butler Yeats composed in 1923 and first published in the Dial in June, 1924, and later published in the collection 'The Cat the Moon and Certain Poems' in 1924. Combining psychological realism with a mystic vision, it describes the swan's rape of Leda. It also alludes to the Trojan War, which will be provoked by the abduction of Helen, who will be begotten by Zeus on Leda (along with Castor and Pollux, in some versions of the myth). Clytaemnestra, who killed her husband, Agamemnon, leader of the Greeks at Troy, was also supposed to have hatched from one of Leda's eggs. The poem is regularly praised as one of Yeats's masterpieces. Camille Paglia, who called the poem "the greatest poem of the twentieth century," and said "all human beings, like Leda, are caught up moment by moment in the 'white rush' of experience. For Yeats, the only salvation is the shapeliness and stillness of art." See external links for a bas relief arranged in the position as described by Yeats.

Nicaraguan poet Rubén Darío's 1892 poem "Leda" contains an oblique description of the rape, watched over by the god Pan.

H.D. (Hilda Doolittle) also wrote a poem called "Leda" in 1919, suggested to be from the perspective of Leda. The description of the sexual action going on makes it seem almost beautiful, as if Leda had given her consent.

In the song "Power and Glory" from Lou Reed's 1992 album Magic and Loss, Reed recalls the experience of seeing his friend dying of cancer and makes reference to the myth:

I saw isotopes introduced into his lungs
trying to stop the cancerous spread
And it made me think of Leda and The Swan
and gold being made from lead

Sylvia Plath alludes to the myth in her radio play Three Women written for the BBC in 1962. The play features the voices of three women. The first is a married woman who keeps her baby. The second is a secretary who suffers a miscarriage. The third voice, a student who is pregnant and gives her baby up for adoption, mentions "the great swan, with its terrible look,/ Coming at me,/ There is a snake in swans./ He glided by; his eye had a black meaning." and repeats a refrain of "I wasn't ready" stating "the face/ Went on shaping itself with love, as if I was ready." describing the unwanted pregnancy.

Carol Ann Duffy included a poem titled Leda in her poetry volume The Bees.

== In literature ==
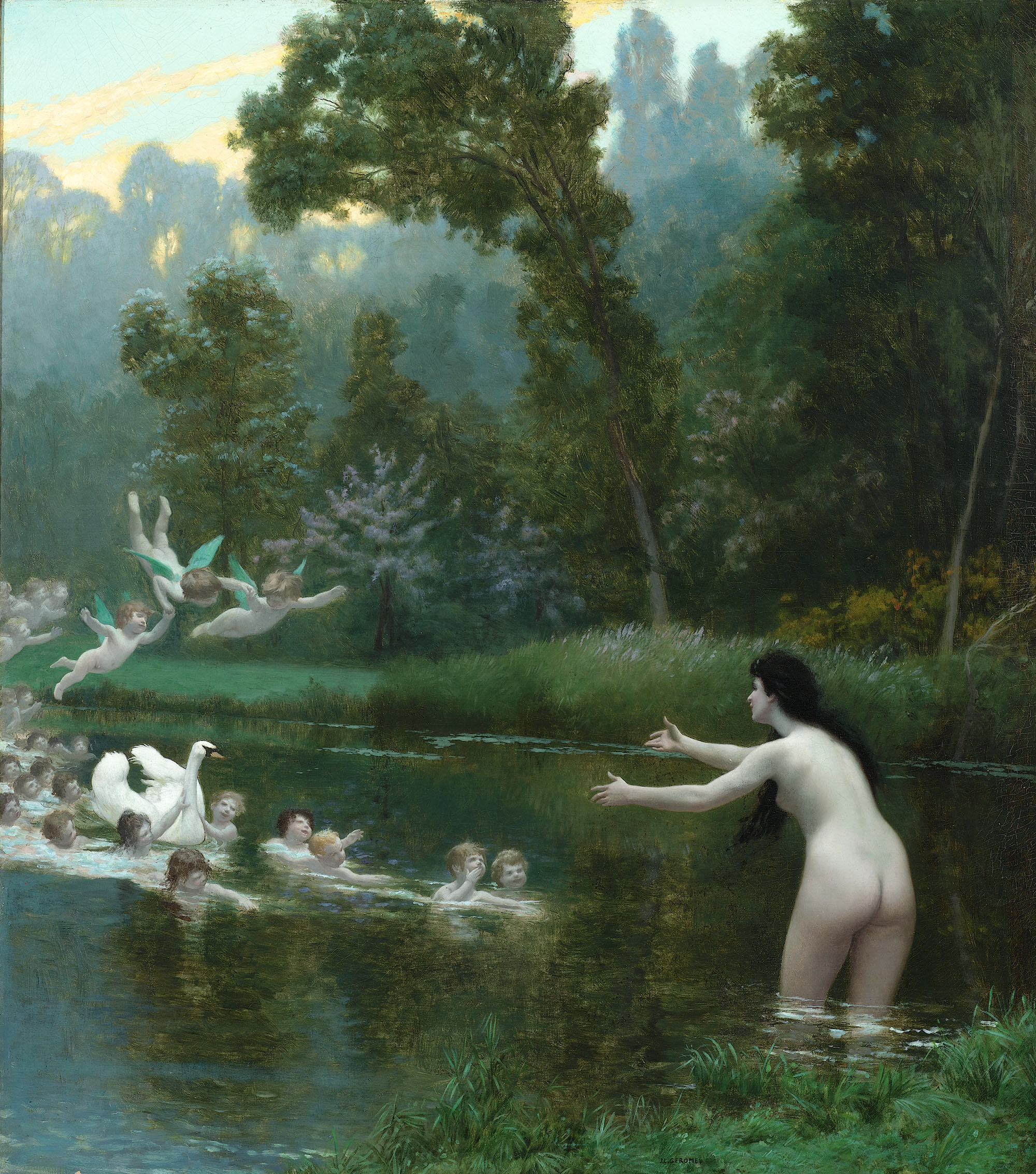
Leda and the Swan by Jean-Léon Gérôme, 1895

Several references to the myth are presented in novels by Angela Carter, including Nights at the Circus and The Magic Toyshop. In the latter novel, the myth is brought to life in the form of a performance in which a frightened young girl is forced to act as Leda in accompaniment with a large mechanical swan.

The myth is also mentioned in Richard Yates' 1962 novel Revolutionary Road. The character Frank Wheeler, married to April Wheeler, after having had sex with an office secretary ponders what to say as he is leaving: "Did the swan apologize to Leda? Did an eagle apologize? Did a lion apologize? Hell no!"

The 1968 play Leda Had a Little Swan by Bamber Gascoigne referenced the legend. It was refused a licence to perform in London, but was briefly staged in New York.

The 2017 novel Strange Heart Beating by Eli Goldstone was inspired by both the myth and the Yeats sonnet based upon it.

In Robert Galbraith's 2020 novel, Troubled Blood, one of the main characters, Robin Ellacott, visits a painting gallery where she sees a painting of Leda and the swan done by one character who is an artist in the novel. Furthermore, the other protagonist of the Strike series, the eponymous detective Cormoran Strike, was born to a mother named Leda and swans appear in several of the novels.

== In fashion ==
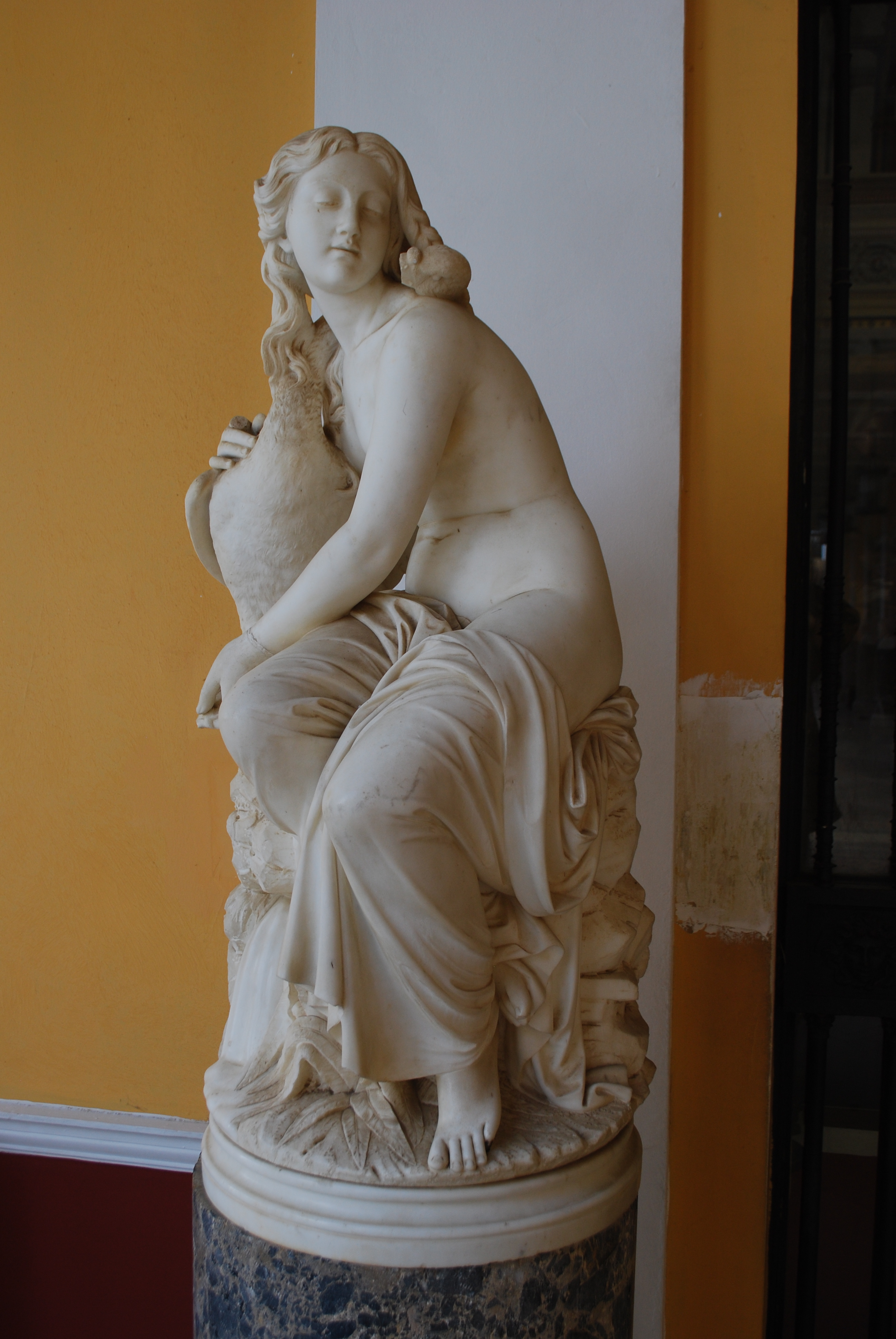
Leda and the Swan statue from Achilleion in Corfu, Greece.

In 1935, German-born movie star Marlene Dietrich wore a dramatically designed Leda costume to a Hollywood costume party. Designed by the acclaimed costume designer Travis Banton, a longtime Dietrich collaborator, the white tulle and feather dress featured a thigh-slit, a mid-length train and, most characteristically, a fabric and feather "swan" neck which coiled around Dietrich's own neck, as well a pair of large feathered wings, one stretching downwards across her chest and the other one upwards across her left shoulder.

Sixty-six years later, at the 2001 Academy Awards, Icelandic singer Björk wore a dress by Marjan Pejoski in nude mesh and a white tulle skirt. The skirt gradually narrowed upwards over the torso to turn into a swan-neck made out of fabric which coiled around the wearer's neck in exactly the same way as Dietrich's dress from 1935. Although Dietrich's costume remains largely unknown to the general public, Björk's dress "attained cult status instantly" and became an icon of red carpet culture. Yet, the reference to Marlene Dietrich's costume was rarely (if ever) mentioned at the time.

In June 2021, Maria Grazia Chiuri as creative director for the French fashion house Dior, designed a collection strongly inspired by Hellenistic culture, the Olympic Games, and Ancient Greek Mythology, and showed it at the Panathenaic Stadium in Athens as an homage to the Olympic tradition (the collection was shown a month before the beginning of the 2020 Summer Olympics). The collection's closing pièce de résistance was a Leda-inspired swan dress. The immediate visual similarity between Chiuri's swan Dress and Björk's swan dress sparked excitement on social media as most people inevitably thought the Dior dress was directly inspired by Pejoski's iconic 2001 creation. However, only a few days later, Dior openly defended the inspiration of the dress referring to it on its Twitter account as a recreation of a costume worn by Marlene Dietrich, who was, famously, an important and loyal client of the French brand during the 40s and 50s. Notably, Chiuri's 2021 Dior dress featured feathered swan-wings spanning over the chest and shoulder. This dramatic detail, taken directly from Dietrich's costume from 1935, sets Chiuri's dress for Dior entirely apart from Björk's red-carpet dress, and makes it, irrefutably, a reference to Dietrich's costume, and by extension, to the myth of Leda and the Swan.

== In modern media ==
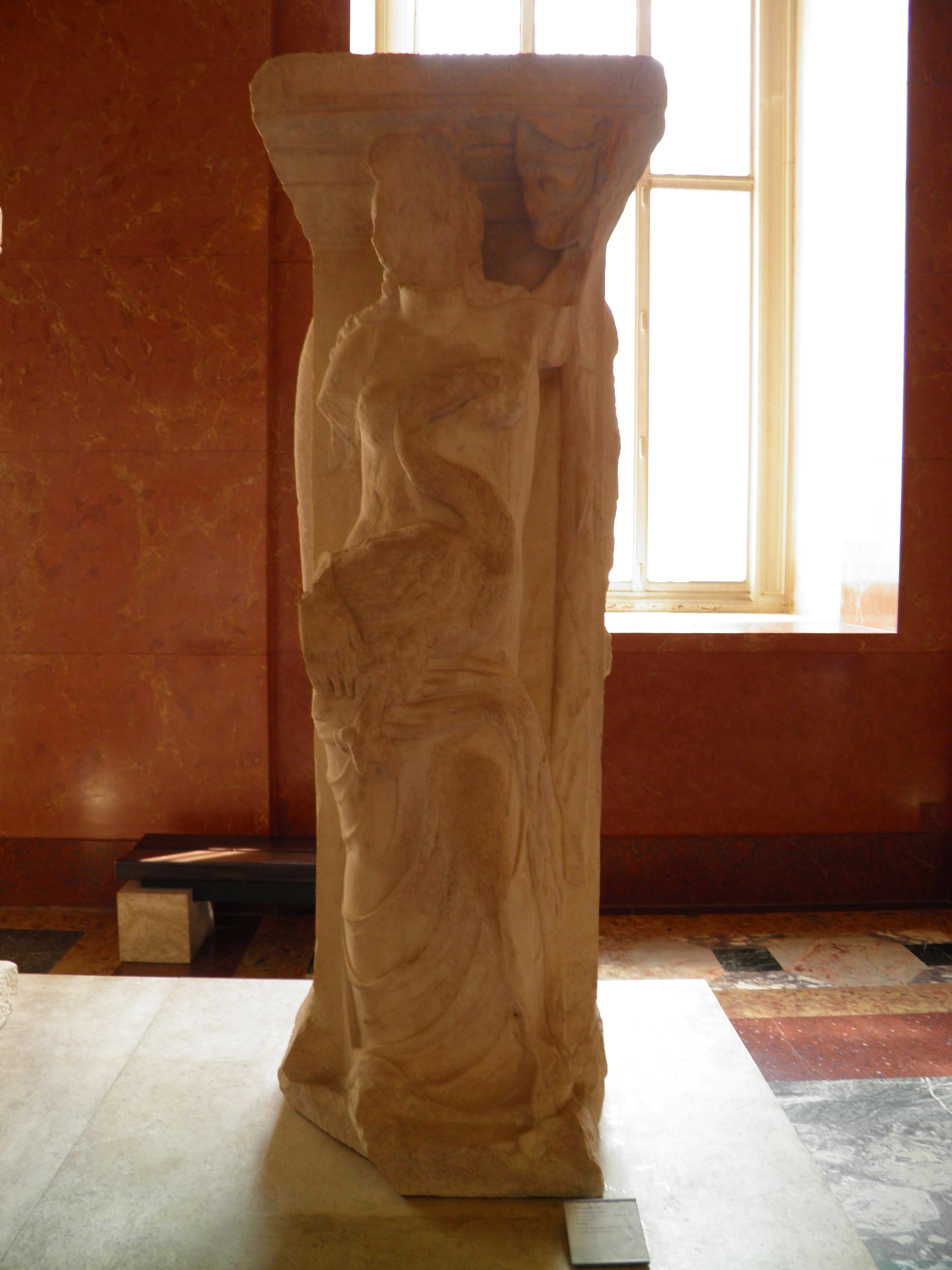
Leda column of Las Incantadas, Louvre.

A version of the Leda and the Swan story is the foundation myth in the Canadian futuristic thriller television series Orphan Black which aired over 5 seasons from 2013 to 2017. A corporation uses genetic engineering to create a series of female clones (Leda) and a series of male clones (Castor) who are also brothers and sisters clones as they derive from one mother who is a chimera with male and female genomes.

Musical artist Hozier released the single "Swan Upon Leda" in 2022, referencing the myth as a tool to advocate for reproductive rights.

The 2021 wordless, 3D feature film Leda takes place in a mid-19th-century mansion.

The Philadelphia cigar maker Bobrow Brothers made a brand of cigars with the name "Leda" which was sold at least into the 1940s. The cigar label depicted Leda and the Swan in a river.

== Modern censorship ==
In April 2012 an art gallery in London, England, was instructed by the police to remove a modern exhibit of Leda and the Swan. The law concerned was Section 63 of the Criminal Justice and Immigration Act 2008, condemning "violent pornography", brought in by the Labour Party government of 2005–2010.

== Gallery ==
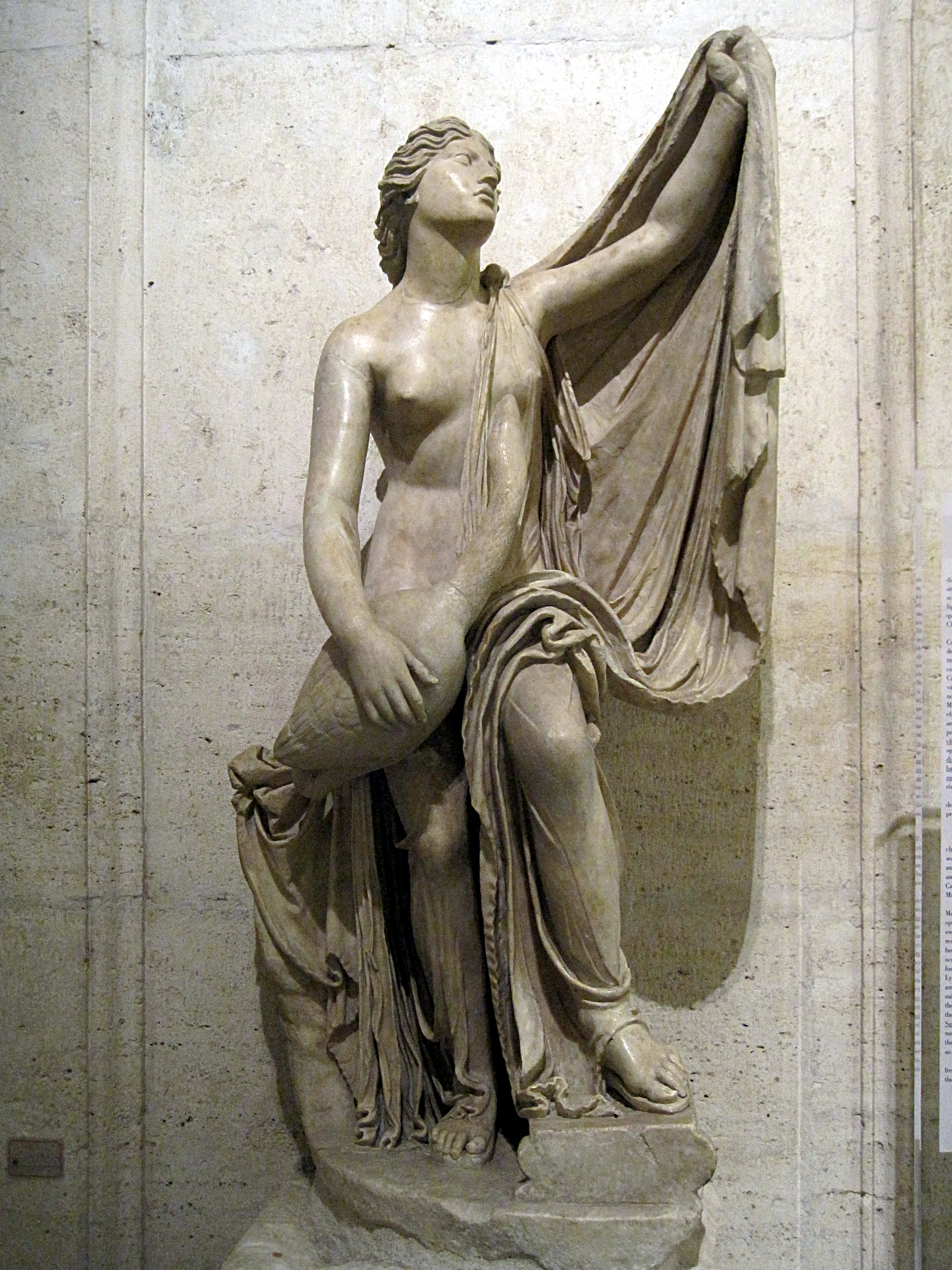
Leda and Zeus transformed into a swan. A 2nd century BCE Roman version of an earlier Greek statue attributed to Timotheos from the 300s BCE. More than two dozen examples of this statue survive. Palazzo Nuovo (Capitoline Museums), Rome.

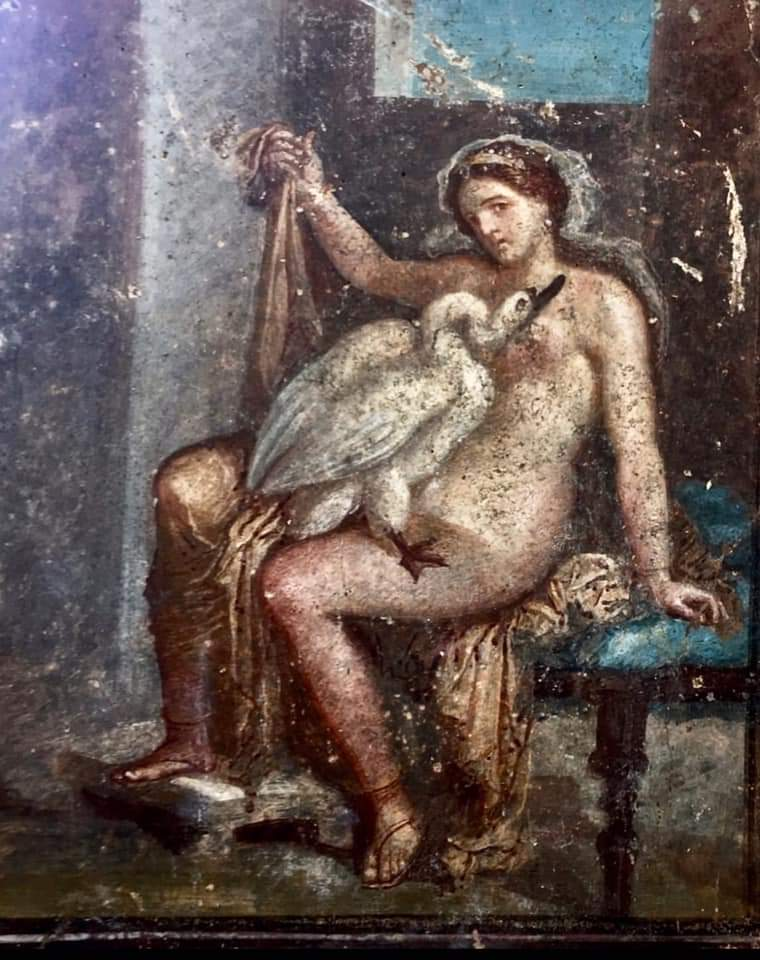
Leda and the Swan, ancient fresco from Pompeii

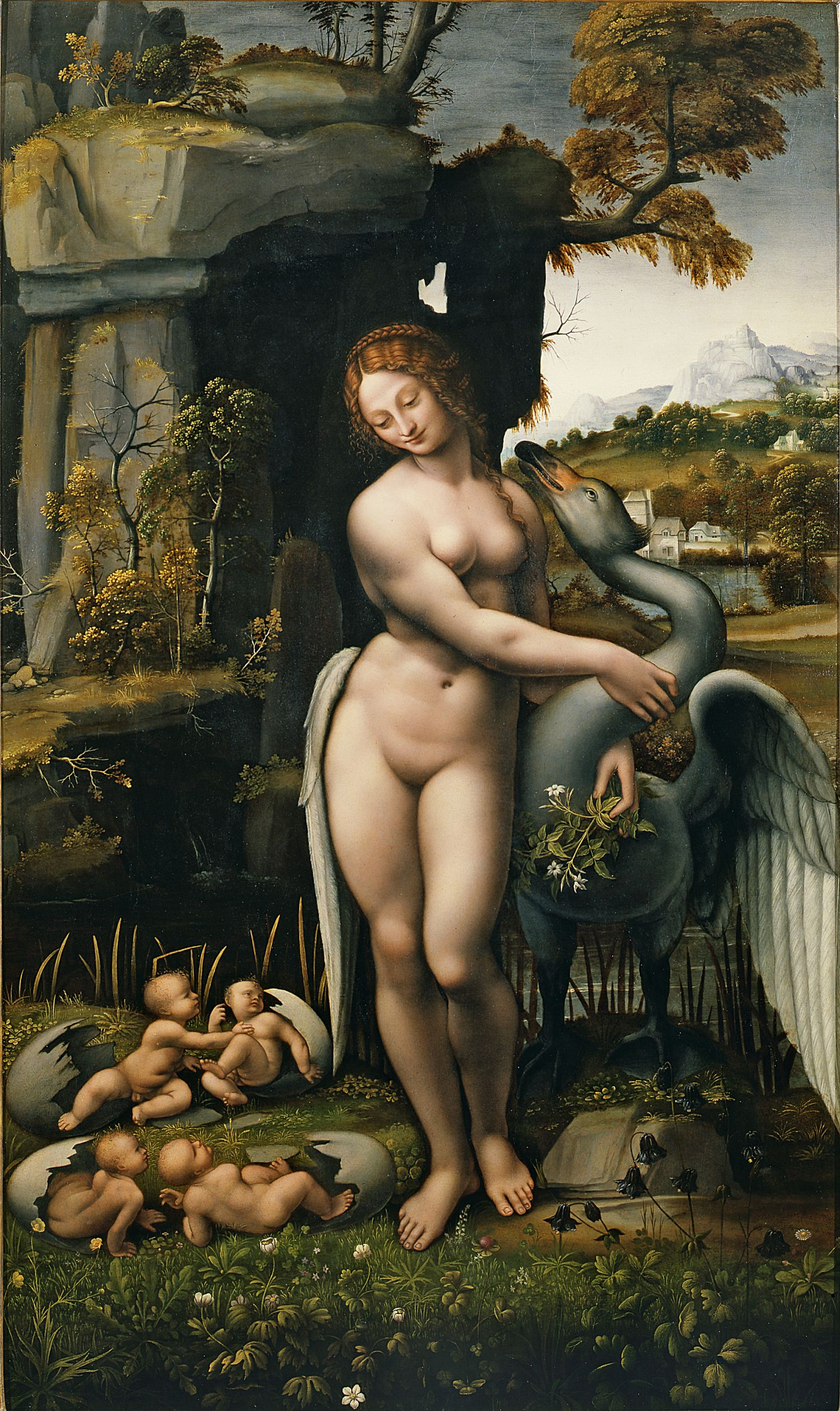
Leda and the Swan copy by Giovanni Francesco Melzi after the lost painting by Leonardo, 1508–1515, oil on canvas, Galleria degli Uffizi, Florence, Italy.

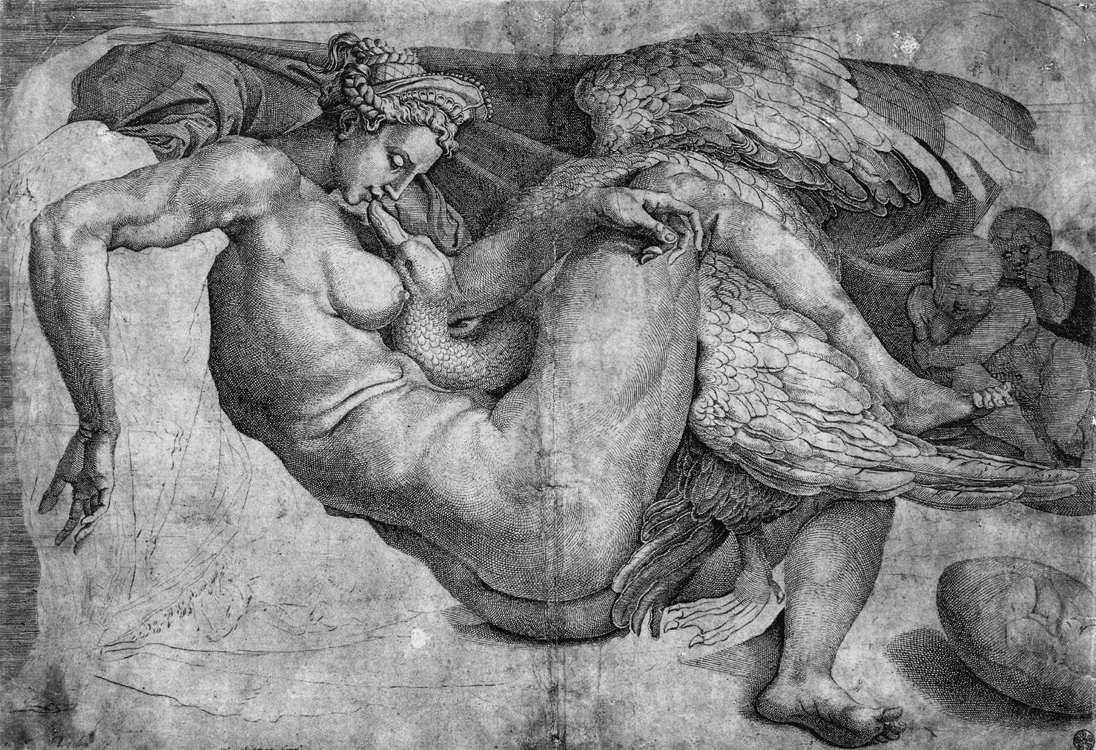
Drawing by Cornelis Bos after the lost original by Michelangelo. Between 1530 and 1550

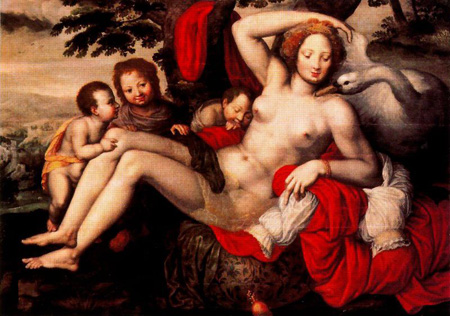
Leda and the Swan. Georg Pencz

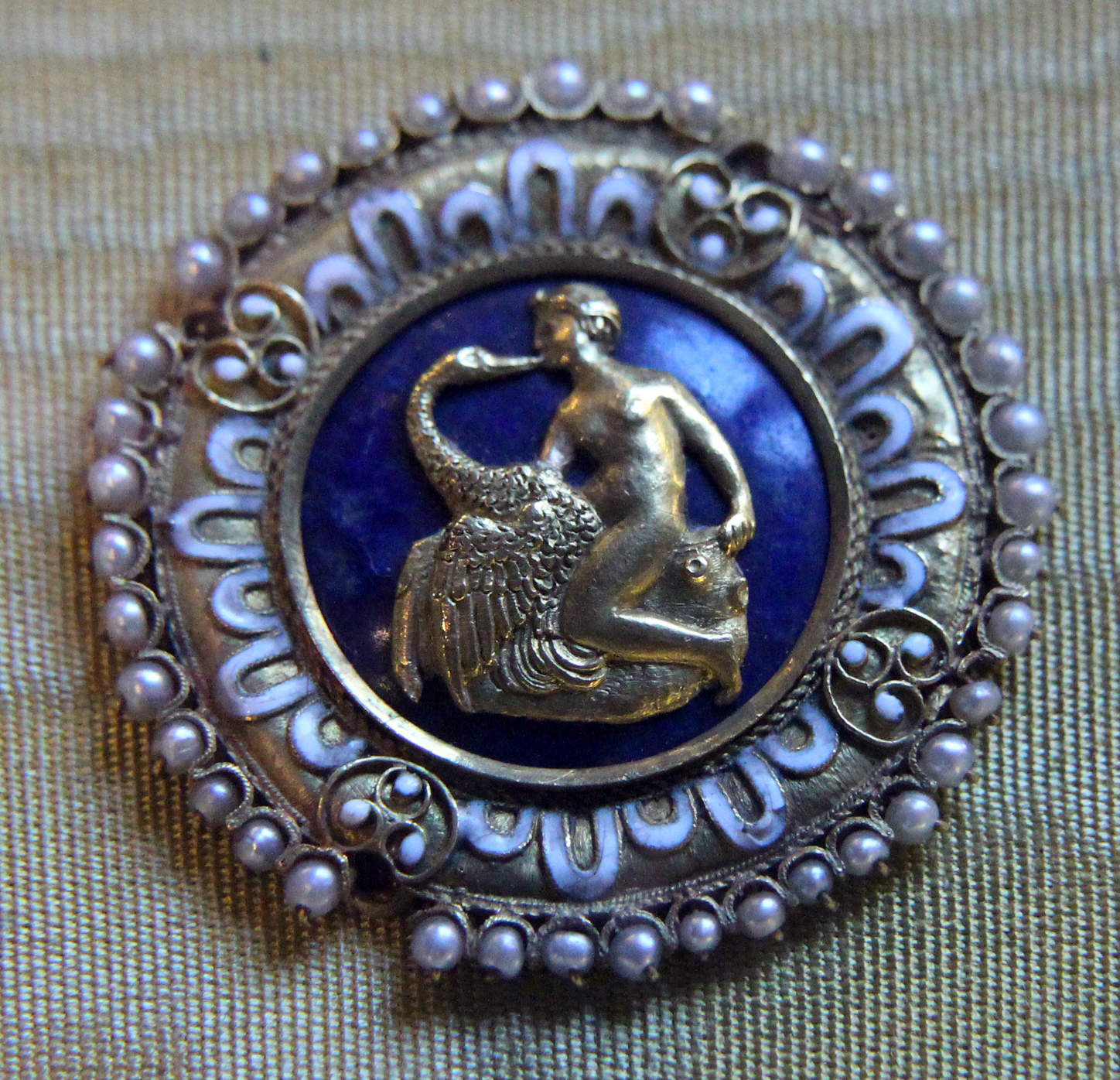
Leda and the Swan by Benvenuto Cellini

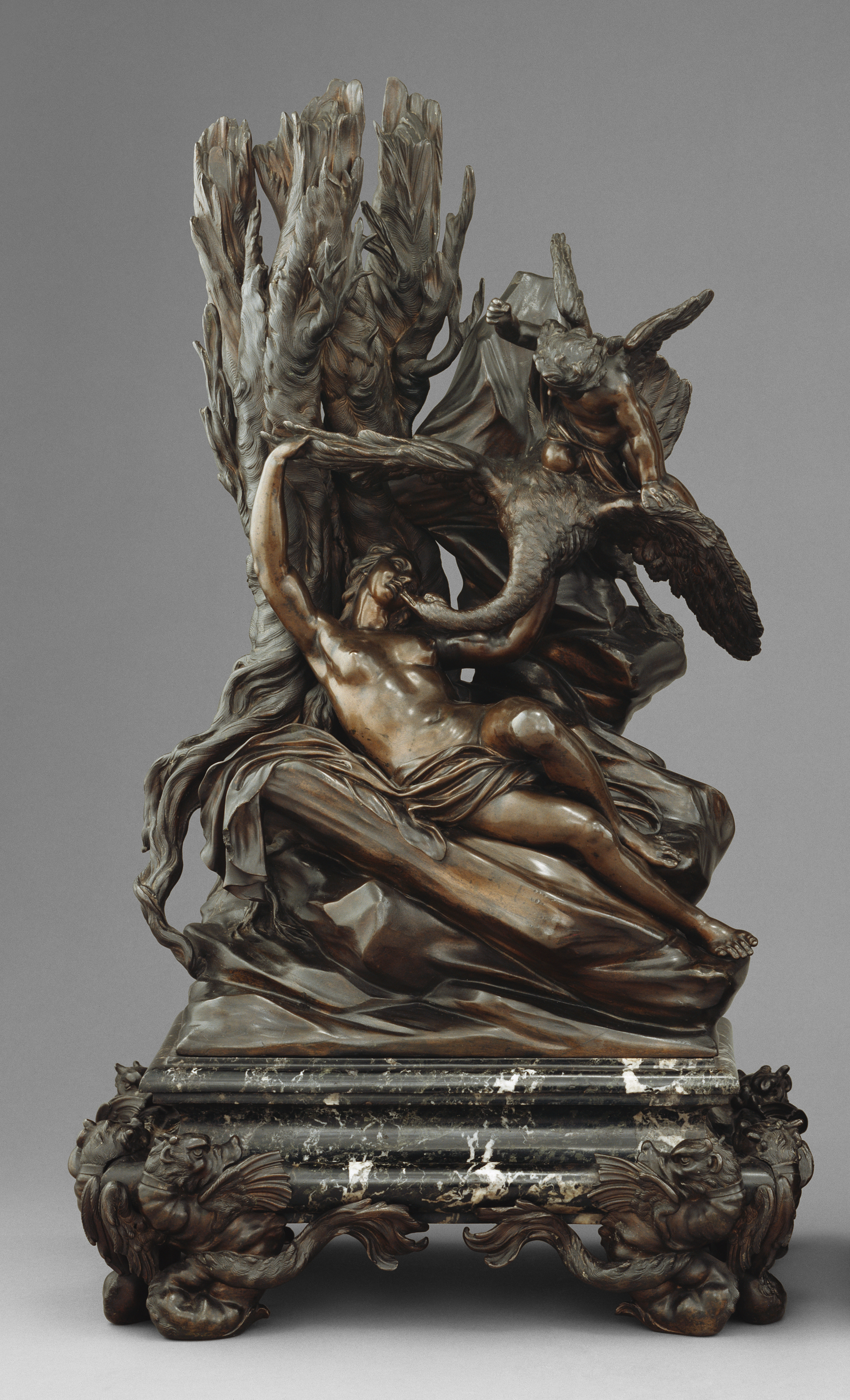
Leda and the Swan, by Massimiliano Soldani, 1725

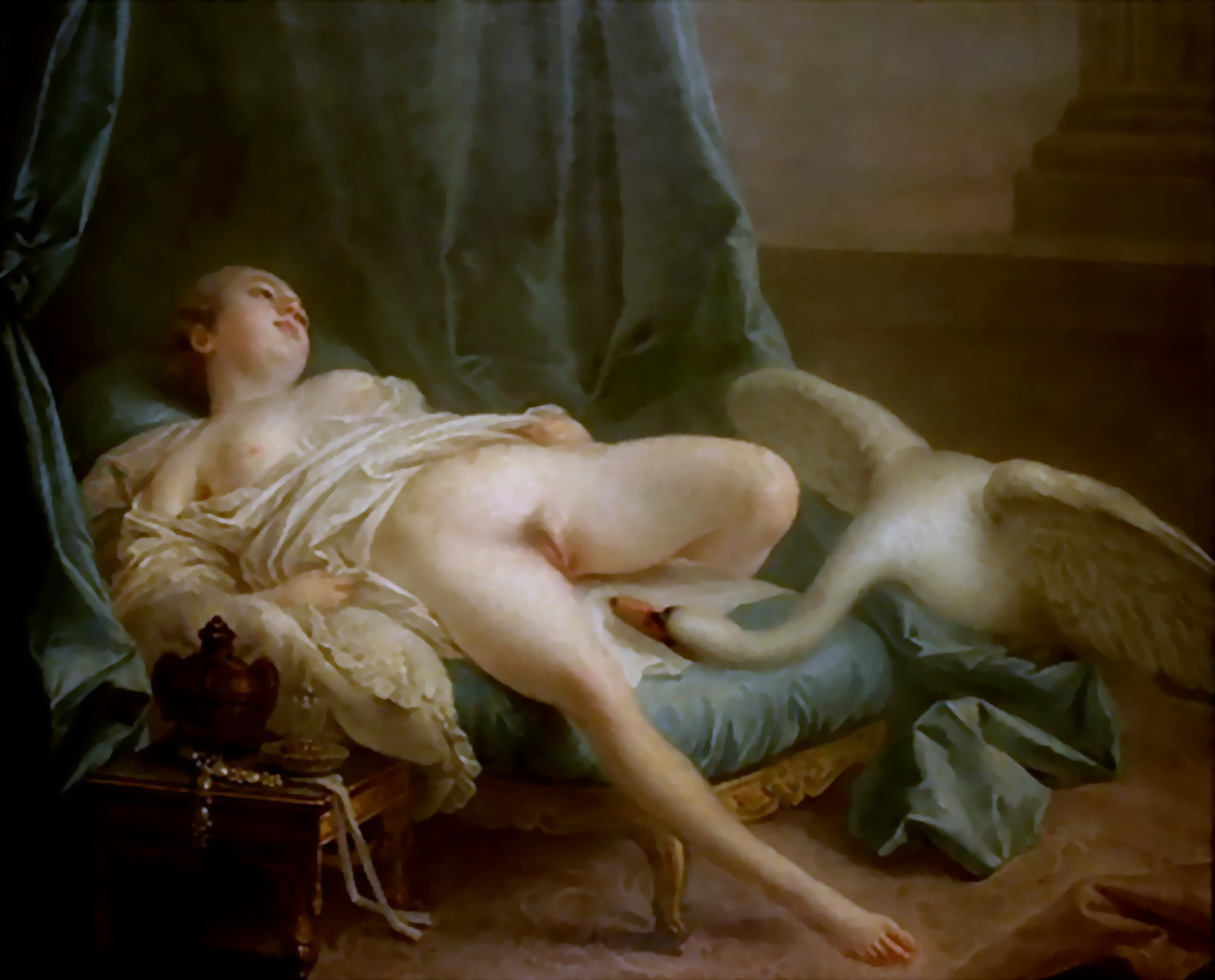
Attributed to François Boucher, 1740, oil on canvas.

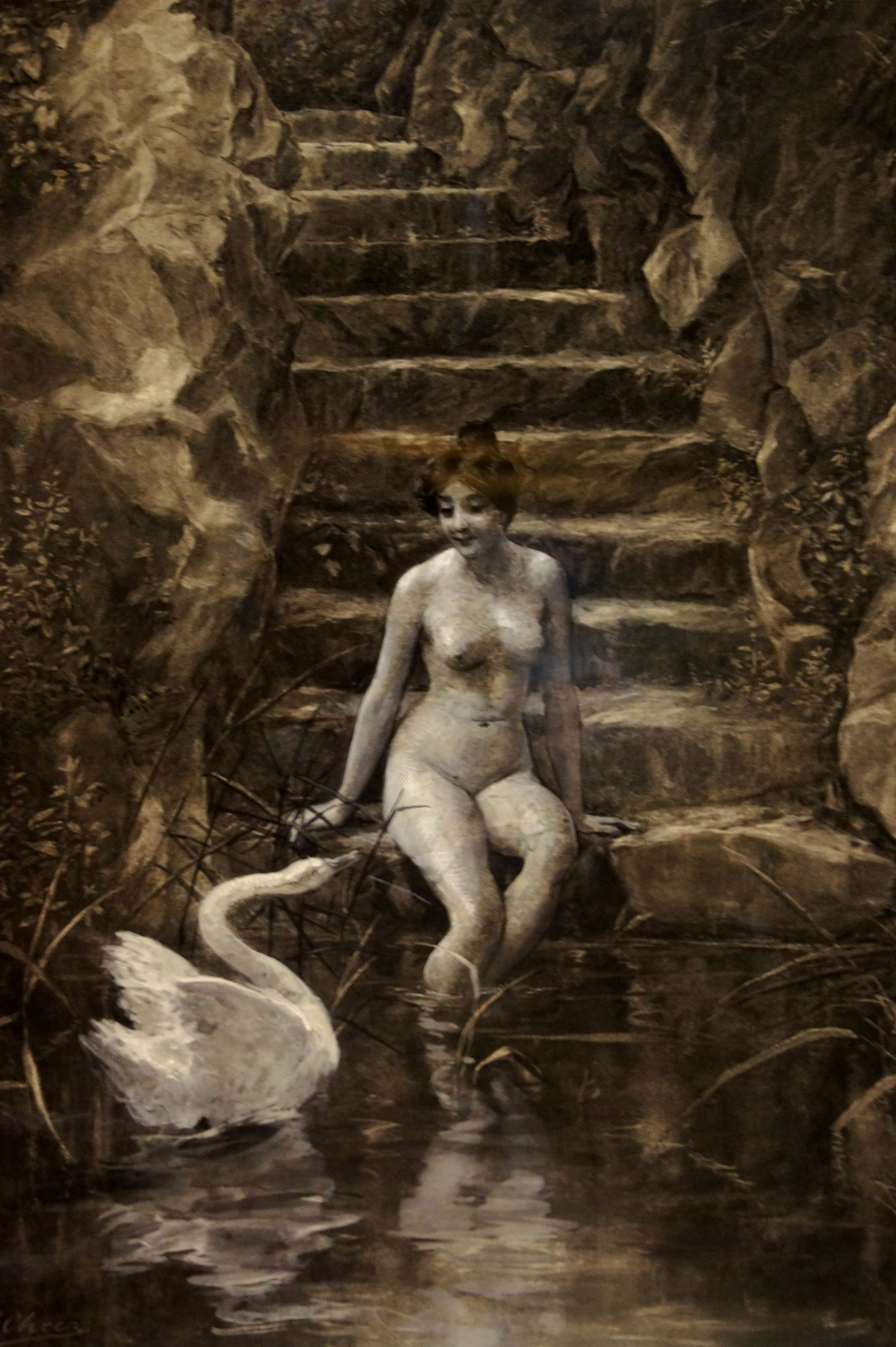
Leda and the Swan, charcoal, gouache on paper. (Ulpiano Checa)

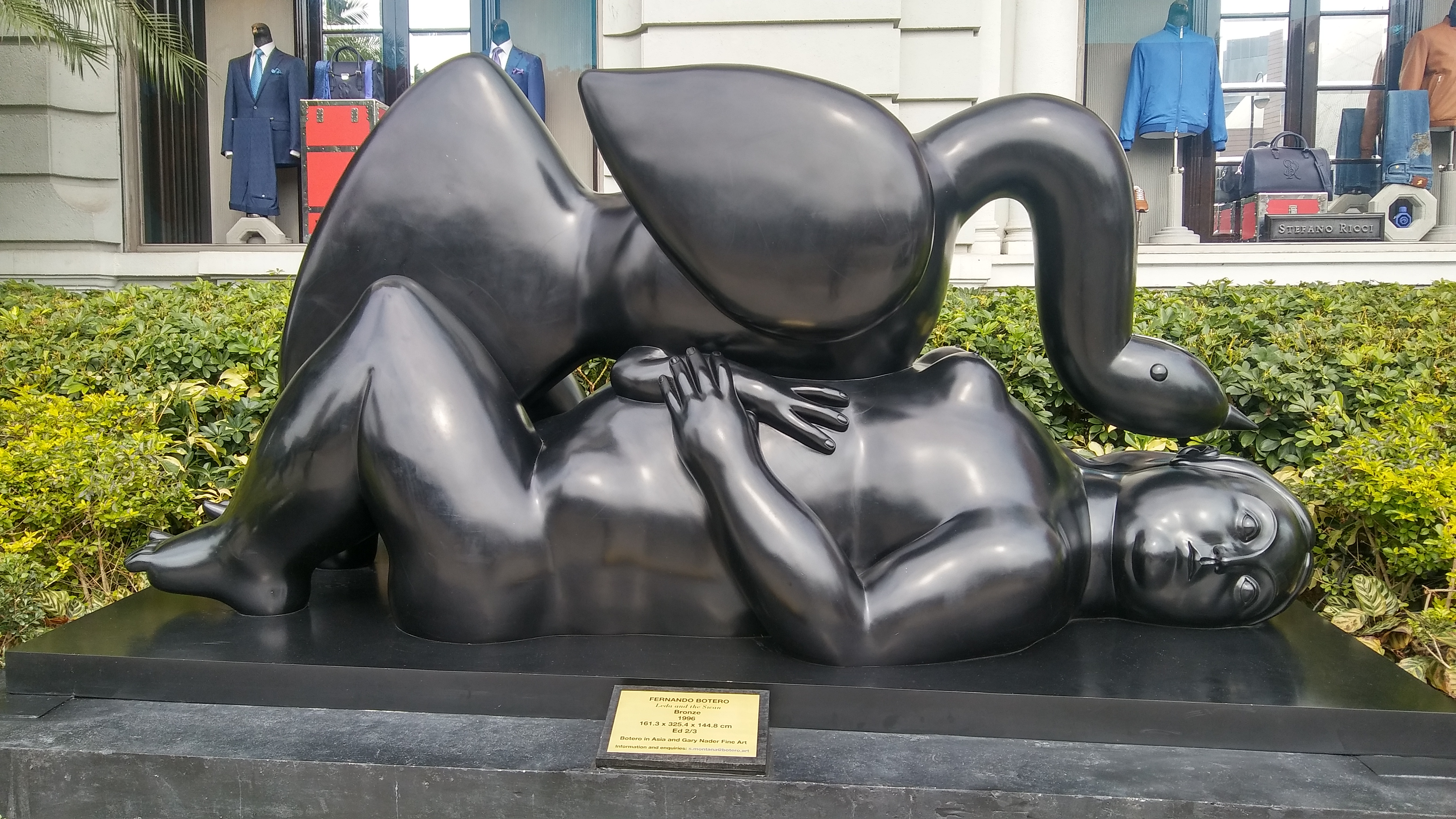
Leda and the Swan by Fernando Botero, 1996

Genieve Figgis, Leda and the Swan (after Boucher), 2018, Acrylic on canvas, 23 x 31 inches

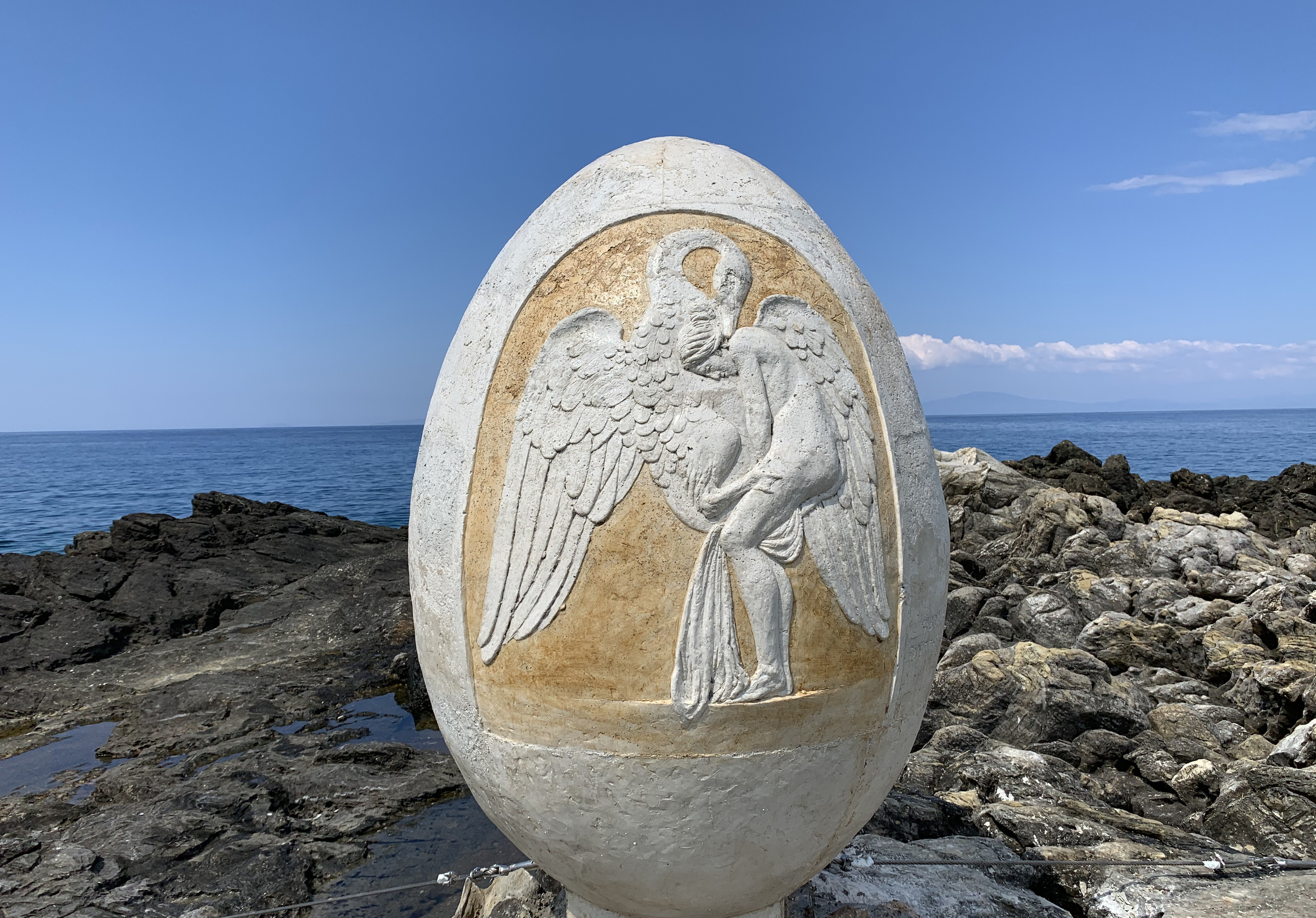
Egg sculpture on Pefnos, 2020, by Yiannis Gouzos and Petros Themelis.
