= Leda and the Swan (Michelangelo) =

Lost painting by Michelangelo

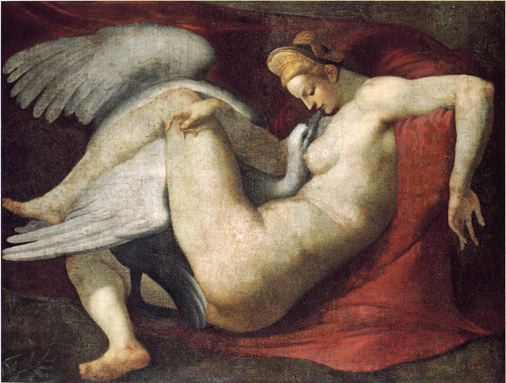
- A copy of Michelangelo's Leda and the Swan, National Gallery
- Artist: Michelangelo
- Year: 1530

Leda and the Swan is a lost tempera on canvas painting by Michelangelo, produced in 1530, but now only surviving in copies and variants. The work depicted the Greek myth of Leda and the Swan.

== History ==
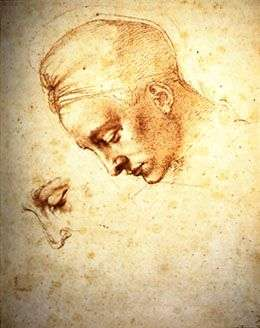
The Casa Buonarroti study for Leda's head is attributed to Michelangelo

In 1512, Alfonso I d'Este, Duke of Ferrara went to Rome to reconcile with Pope Julius II, who had excommunicated him in the summer of 1510 for his alliance with Louis XII of France against the Republic of Venice. Julius absolved him and Alfonso spent a few days in Rome before returning to Ferrara. On 11 July, he visited the Sistine Chapel, where Michelangelo was completing the ceiling. He climbed the scaffolding and had a long and admiring conversation with Michelangelo, who promised him a painting.

Several years passed without the commission being formalised until Michelangelo had to be in Ferrara in 1529 to inspect its city walls as "governor general of fortifications" for the Florentine Republic, ready for an expected Imperial siege. On that occasion the Duke held Michelangelo to his promise and, according to Condivi and Vasari, he produced the work when he returned to Florence in August 1530, after the city's fall, perhaps using the time he had to spend in hiding. It was a square work in tempera, representing Jupiter as a swan having sex with a reclining Leda (based on a composition from ancient Roman gems and seals), an egg, and Castor and Pollux as children.

The painting was completed by mid-October 1530, but Alfonso described it as a "little thing" in Michelangelo's hearing and so he refused to hand it over. The work and some of the preparatory drawings were acquired later (either as a purchase or a gift) by Antonio Mini, who took it to France in 1531. In 1532, he left the painting to Francis I of France, who later sent it to the Palace of Fontainebleau.

The controversial nature of Michelangelo's rendition of Leda and the Swan may have contributed to the disappearance of his original painting and cartoon. According to reports, Queen Anne of Austria ordered the destruction of the painting in the seventeenth century due to her objections to its perceived "lasciviousness." An inventory from 1691 documents this act of erasure, as well as the existence of a drawing by Michelangelo depicting Leda, which was marked for burning. The absence of this drawing from subsequent inventories suggests that it was likely destroyed, sold, or given away.

The best known copy of the painting was once attributed to Rosso Fiorentino and is in the National Gallery in London, with others in the Gemäldegalerie (Dresden), the Gemäldegalerie (Berlin), and the Correr Museum in Venice. The Casa Buonarroti in Florence holds not only a copy, but also a preparatory drawing of studies for Leda's head, held to be drawn by Michelangelo. There are several prints copying the work, the most faithful of which is thought to be the one by Nicolas Béatrizet, which also shows Castor and Pollux.

== See also ==
- List of works by Michelangelo
