= Eurythemis =

Ancient Greek female name

In Greek mythology, the name Eurythemis (Ancient Greek: Εὐρύθεμις) may refer to the following women:

- Eurythemis, daughter of Cleoboea. According to the mythographer Apollodorus, she was the wife of King Thestius of Pleuron and mother of Althaea, Leda, Hypermnestra, Iphiclus, Evippus, Plexippus and Eurypylus.
- Eurythemis, daughter of Acastus, consort of Actor and mother of Ancaeus according to John Tzetzes.
- Eurythemis, daughter of Timandreus and sister of Cotto. The two sisters were honored by the Heraclidae for having supported them in their struggle for returning to Peloponnesos.
