= Elita Veidemane =

Latvian journalist, publicist and public worker

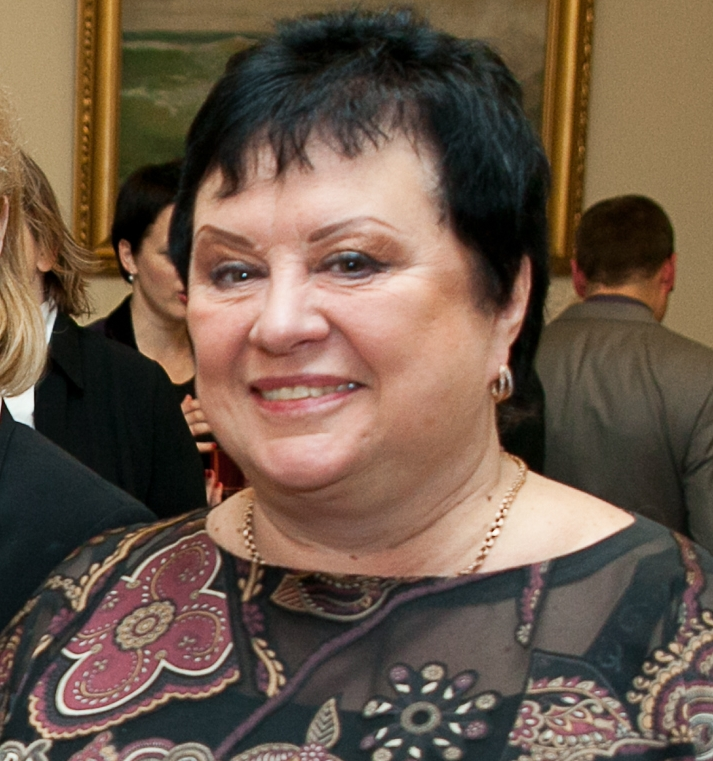
- Elita Veidmane at the Saeima building in 2012
- Born: December 9, 1955 (age 70); Riga, Latvian SSR, Soviet Union
- Occupation: Publicist

Elita Veidemane (born December 9, 1955, in Riga) is a Latvian journalist, publicist and public worker. In 1980 she graduated from the Latvian State University Faculty of Philology, and from 1981 to 1988 worked for the newspaper Padomju Jaunatne (Soviet Youth). She worked as a Latvian language and literature teacher at a school in Jūrmala in the 1980s. From 1988 until its closure in 1992 she was the chief editor of the Latvian Popular Front publication Atmoda (Revival).

Since 2008 she is the Deputy Chief Editor of the daily newspaper Neatkarīgā Rīta Avīze.
