= Atmoda =

Latvian newspaper

Atmoda ('Awakening' in Latvian) was a weekly newspaper in the Latvian SSR and Latvia issued from December 1988 to April 1992. It was published by the Popular Front of Latvia (PFL) and was the first independent opposition paper in the Latvian SSR. The newspaper's name is a reference to Latvian revival movements known as the Latvian national awakenings.

For most of its run, the chief editor of Atmoda was journalist Elita Veidemane, and its editorial policy was independent of the PFL leadership. The newspaper was issued in Latvian and Russian, with the English edition Awakening published monthly. Initially issued under the same name (Russian: Атмода), the Russian edition was renamed in 1990 to Baltijskoje vremja (Russian: Балтийское время, 'The Baltic Times'). The newspaper was popular not only in Latvia but also among the population of the Soviet Union, and the Russian edition peaked at 80,000 in circulation, with a total peak circulation of about 250,000.

Both foreign-language editions were discontinued in 1992. In 1993, a dispute erupted over the fate of mass media in the new independent state. PFL wanted to see Atmoda as an organ of the party, while journalists stood on freedom of the press. This led to a court suit over the division of assets and to the appearance of various splinter newspapers and magazines, notably Atmoda Atpūtāi, led by Veidemane, which was published until 1996. The last issue of Atmoda was published on April 7, 1992, although the information bulletin version of the paper was issued by the PFL until 1994.
