= Leninist Young Communist League of Latvia =

Latvian branch of the Soviet Komsomol

Leninist Young Communist League of Latvia LĻKJS Latvian: Latvijas Ļeņina Komunistiskā jaunatnes savienība
- Founded: 18 October 1940
- Dissolved: 10 September 1991
- Headquarters: Riga, Latvian Soviet Socialist Republic
- Membership: 202,321 (1990)
- Ideology: Communism; Marxism-Leninism
- Mother party: Communist Party of the Soviet Union
- State party: Communist Party of Latvia
- National affiliation: Komsomol
- International affiliation: World Federation of Democratic Youth
- Newspaper: Padomju Jaunatne

The Leninist Young Communist League of Latvia (Latvian: Latvijas Ļeņina Komunistiskā jaunatnes savienība, LĻKJS) was the Latvian branch of the Soviet Komsomol that served as the youth wing of the Communist Party of Latvia from 1940 to 1991.

== History ==
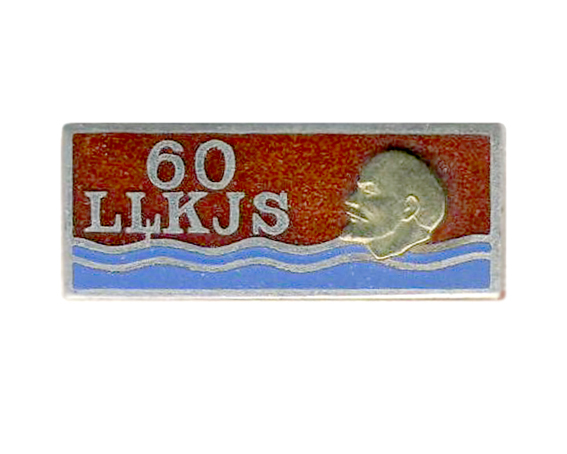
Badge commemorating the 60th anniversary of the LĻKJS

The LĻKJS was founded in 1940, during the Soviet occupation of Latvia, as a union of formerly clandestine communist youth organizations that operated in independent Latvia between the World Wars. Membership of the LĻKJS was predominantly ethnically Latvian, with a substantial Russian minority.

In early 1990, delegates at the LĻKJS Congress voted to adopt a new set of organisational statutes independent of the all-Union Komsomol, but not amounting to a full withdrawal. This action was precipitated by the independence of the Estonian and Lithuanian branches of the all-Union Komsomol in 1989 and 1990, respectively.
