= Aelita =

Aelita may refer to:

== Arts and entertainment ==
=== Film and television ===
- Aelita (film), a 1924 Soviet silent film
- Aelita, a 1980 Hungarian television film by András Rajnai
- "Aelita" (Code Lyoko episode), 2006

=== Literature ===
- Aelita (novel), a 1923 novel by Alexei Tolstoy
- Aelita Prize, Soviet/Russian award for science fiction writers
- Aelita (convention), a Soviet/Russian science fiction convention where the Aelita Prize is awarded

=== Music ===
- Aelita (Tied & Tickled Trio album), 2007
- Ælita, a 2014 album by Mando Diao

== Personal name ==
=== People ===
- Aelita Andre (born 2007), Australian painter
- Aelita Yurchenko (born 1965), Ukrainian sprinter

=== Fictional characters ===
- A character in the 1923 novel and the 1924 film Aelita
- A character in the 1988 film Aelita, Do Not Pester Men!
- Aelita Schaeffer, a character in the 2006 animated television series Code Lyoko
- A character in the 2014 video game Lifeless Planet

== Other uses ==
- 2401 Aehlita, a minor planet in the main asteroid belt of the Solar System
- Aelita (synthesizer), a synthesizer manufactured in the Soviet Union
- Aelita project, an abandoned Soviet project of a crewed flight to Mars
- Aelita Software Corporation, an American software company
- Aelita (spacecraft) abandoned Soviet infrared astronomy telescope satellite

== See also ==
- Aleta
- Alita
- Elita
