= Aleta =

This name should not be confused with the name Aelita.

Aleta may refer to:

== Fictional characters ==
- Queen Aleta, wife of Prince Valiant, Queen of the Misty Isles in the comic strip Prince Valiant
- Princess Aleta in the television series The Legend of Prince Valiant
- Aleta Ogord of the Guardians of the Galaxy

== People ==
- Aleta Baun, Indonesian environmental activist
- Aleta Fenceroy (1948–2006), American LGBT activist
- Aleta Freel (1907–1935), American stage actress
- Aleta Mitchell, American film, television and theatre actress
- Aleta Arthur Trauger (born 1945), US federal judge

== Geographical locations ==
- Aleta Wendo (woreda), one of the 77 woredas in the Southern Nations, Nationalities and Peoples' Region of Ethiopia
- Aleta Wendo, the administrative center of the woreda

== Other ==
- West Aleta, a ship of the Western Pipe and Steel Company

== See also ==
- Aelita
- Alita (disambiguation)
- Elita
