= Laophonte =

In Greek mythology, Laophonte (Ancient Greek: Λαοφόντη) was the daughter of Pleuron and Xanthippe and thus sister to Agenor, Sterope and Stratonice. She was also said to be the mother of Iphiclus, Leda and Althaea by Thestius but Alcman attested that Leda's father was Glaucus.
