= Lita =

Lita or LITA may refer to:

== People ==
- Lita (given name)
- Lita (wrestler) (born 1975), American professional wrestler
- Lita (surname)

== Places ==
- Lita, Jiangxi, China
- Lita, a parish in Ibarra Canton, Ecuador
- Lita, Cluj, Romania
- Lița, Romania

== Other uses ==
- Lita (album), an album by Lita Ford
- Lita, fictional currency used in the Star Trek universe by Bajorans
- Left internal thoracic artery (LITA), an arterial conduit often used for coronary artery bypass surgery
- Library and Information Technology Association
- List and Tabulate (LITA), a precursor of the programming language Filetab
