= Leta Myers Smart =

American writer

- Leta Myers Smart, from a 1931 newspaper
- Born: Leta Von F. Myers; March 15, 1893; Nebraska, U.S.
- Died: June 8, 1981 (aged 88); Los Angeles, California, U.S.
- Other name: Leta Meyers Smart
- Occupations: Writer, activist
- Relatives: Antonine Barada (great-grandfather)

Leta Von Felden Myers Smart (March 15, 1893 – June 8, 1981) was an American writer, and a member of the Omaha people who was active on the national level for American Indian rights.

== Early life ==
Myers was born in Nebraska, the daughter of Garry P. Meyers and Dora Von Felden Meyers. Her father was a blacksmith and an alumnus of the Carlisle Indian Industrial School. Antonine Barada, an Omaha folk hero, was her great-grandfather. She described herself as a relative and former secretary of Omaha lawyer Thomas L. Sloan.

Myers attended Hampton Institute from 1910 to 1912. She was denied admission at the Carlisle Indian Industrial School because she was less than a quarter Indian by ancestry. She was listed as 1/16 Omaha in the census of the Omaha Reservation taken in 1932.

== Career ==
Smart was active in the National Council of American Indians, and in the California Indian Rights Association. In 1923, she brought her newborn daughter to Washington, D.C., to demand that the Bureau of Indian Affairs be abolished. In 1931, she questioned the Indian affiliations of entertainer Big Chief White Horse Eagle, and he in turn questioned her Omaha identity. (She was later proven correct; White Horse Eagle was also known as John Delaney, a "professional ethnic impersonator.") She was especially active in establishing the full citizenship of Native Americans. "She has little sympathy with those whose primary interest is the 'romance' of tribal Indian history," reported a Los Angeles paper in 1931, which quoted her as saying "I am not nearly so much concerned over the shape of my grandfather's skull as I am over what is going to happen to me and my child."

Smart spoke to community groups about laws affecting Indian rights. In 1937 and 1938, she testified at Congressional hearings on the land rights of the Agua Caliente Band of Mission Indians, though members of the Band rejected her standing to testify about their business. In 1945, she represented Los Angeles at the National Council of American Indians, held in Montana. In 1948, her involvement in a Navajo relief drive sponsored by Will Rogers Jr. came under scrutiny by the city of Los Angeles, particularly her eligibility to be paid by the campaign's funds.

In the 1950s, Smart led the successful effort to remove two statues, The Discovery of America and The Rescue, from the steps of the United States Capitol. She wrote many letters to the National Sculpture Society, arguing that the representations of Native Americans in these statues was disgraceful, shameful, and "deplorable."

== Publications ==
- "W-H-O" (1920)
- "On a Nickel" (1921)
- "A Picture" (1921)
- "A Young Man's Adventure with Opportunity" (1922)
- "The Last Rescue" (1959, Harper's)

== Personal life and legacy ==
Myers married Frank G. Smart in 1921. They had a daughter, Waneta, and later divorced. She and her daughter moved to Los Angeles together in the 1930s. In 1946, Smart spent 30 days in jail after she was convicted of striking Waneta's husband, actor Victor Heyden, with a telephone. She was also prohibited from uninvited visits with Waneta or her husband for two years. She died in 1981, at the age of 87, in Los Angeles.

There is a folder of papers related to Smart in the library of the University of Nevada, Reno. Her work is included in Changing is not Vanishing: A Collection of American Indian Poetry to 1930 (2011).
