= Leda (mythology) =

Greek mythological Aetolian princess who became a Spartan queen

- Spartan Queen
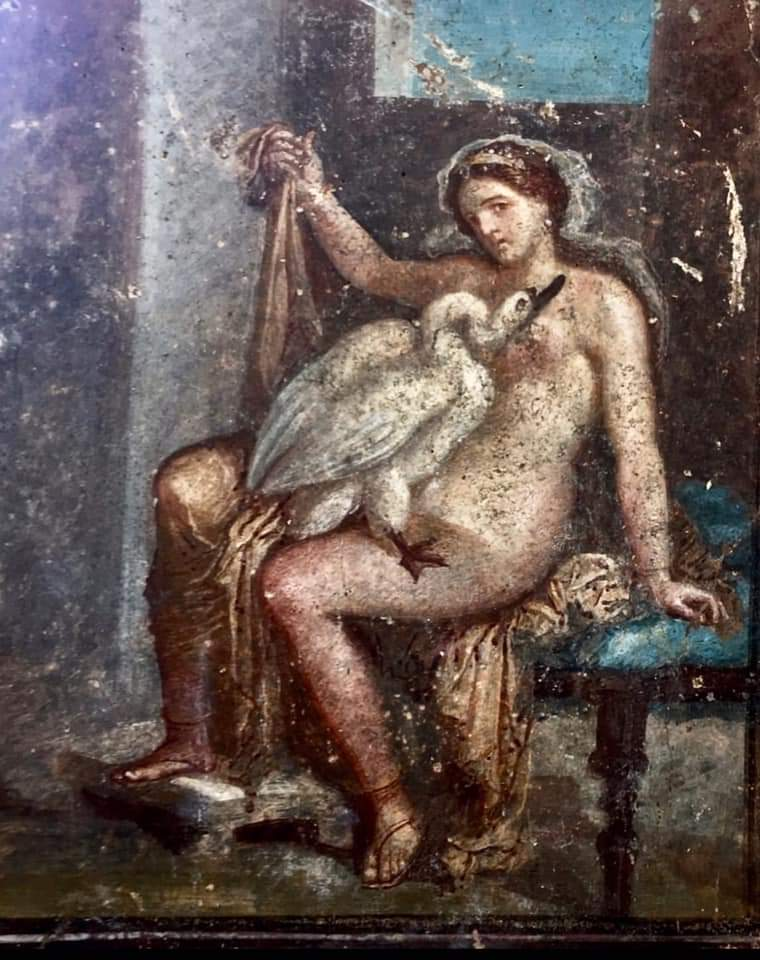
- Ancient fresco from Pompeii depicting Leda and the swan
- Abode: Aetolia, Sparta

Genealogy
- Parents: Thestius (father); Leucippe, Deidameia, Eurythemis, or Laophonte (mother)
- Siblings: Althaea, Iphiclus, Plexippus, Hypermnestra, Evippus, and Eurypylus
- Spouse: Tyndareus
- Offspring: Castor and Pollux, Clytemnestra, Helen of Troy, Philonoe, Phoebe, Timandra

In Greek mythology, Leda (/ˈliːdə, ˈleɪ-/; Ancient Greek: Λήδα [lɛ́ːdaː]), also rendered as Lede, was an Aetolian princess who became queen consort of Sparta through her marriage to King Tyndareus. Zeus fell in love with Leda, and to avoid his wife Hera's jealousy, assaulted her while disguised as a swan. Leda was named as the mother of four famous children in Greek mythology: Helen of Troy, Clytemnestra, and the twins Castor and Pollux. Leda and the Swan was a popular motif in the visual arts, particularly during the Renaissance.

== Family ==
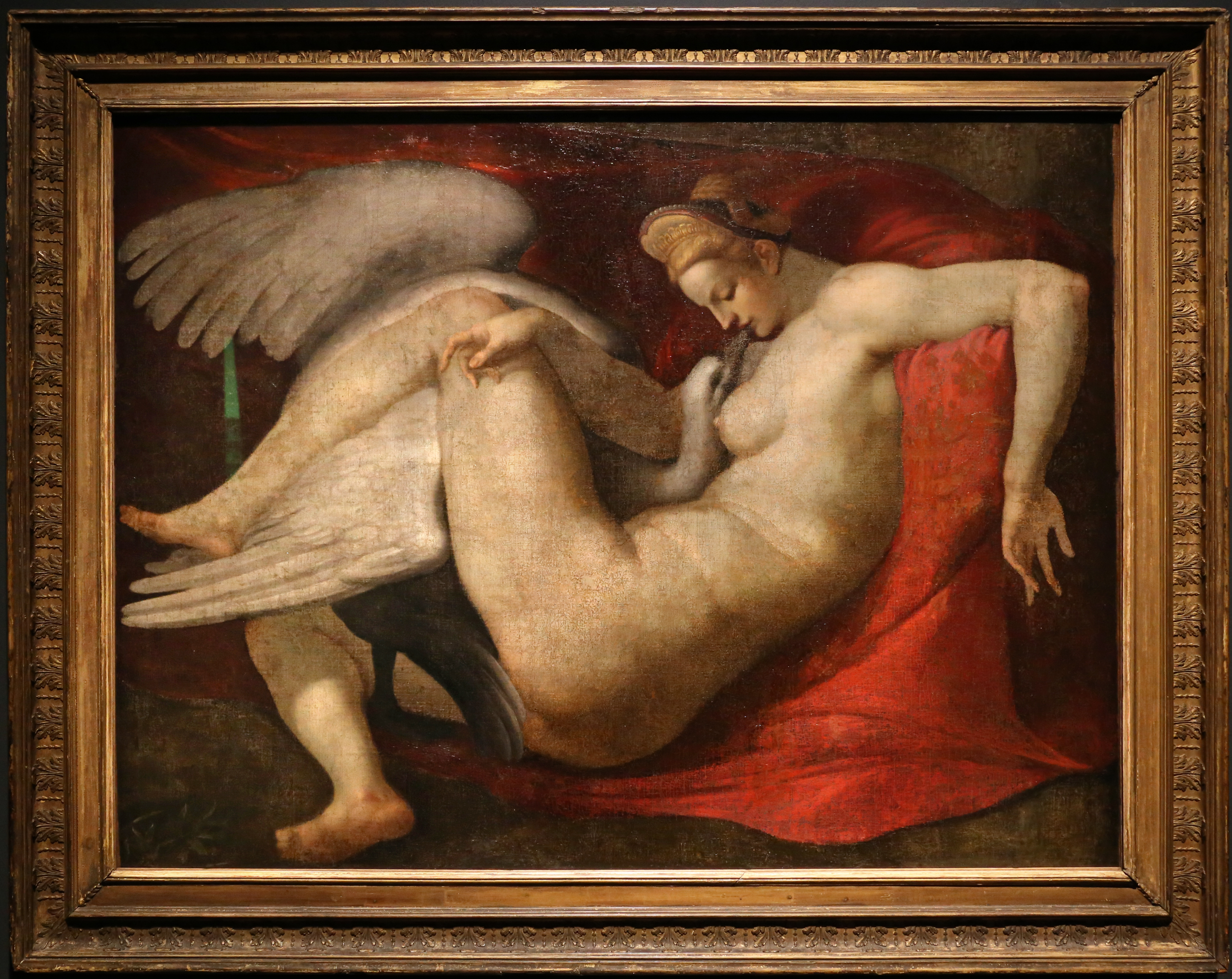
Leda and the Swan, 16th-century copy after the lost painting by Michelangelo

While her parentage is disputed, Leda is most commonly named as a daughter of the Aetolian king Thestius, a son of Ares; she was occasionally referred to as Thestias. Her mother is disputed, and could have been Leucippe, Deidameia, daughter of Perieres, Eurythemis, daughter of Cleoboea, or Laophonte, daughter of Pleuron. According to Alcman, Leda's parents were Glaucus and Laophonte while Eumelus attested that they were Sisyphus and Panteiduia or Paneidyia.

Leda had up to six siblings. Apollodorus named two sisters: Althaea and Hypermnestra, and four brothers: Iphiclus, Plexippus, Eurypylus, and Evippus. In his Fabulae, Hyginus named Iphiclus and Althaea as Leda's only siblings. Althaea is almost always named as Leda's sister.

Leda married king Tyndareus of Sparta and by him became the mother of three daughters: Phoebe, Timandra, and Philonoe. She also bore four additional children by both Zeus and Tyndareus: Helen of Troy, Clytemnestra, and the twins Castor and Pollux. Leda lay with Tyndareus the same night she was seduced by Zeus, and Pollux and Helen were children of Zeus while Clytemnestra and Castor were children of Tyndareus. This explains why Castor was frequently described as mortal while Pollux was described as immortal.

== Mythology ==
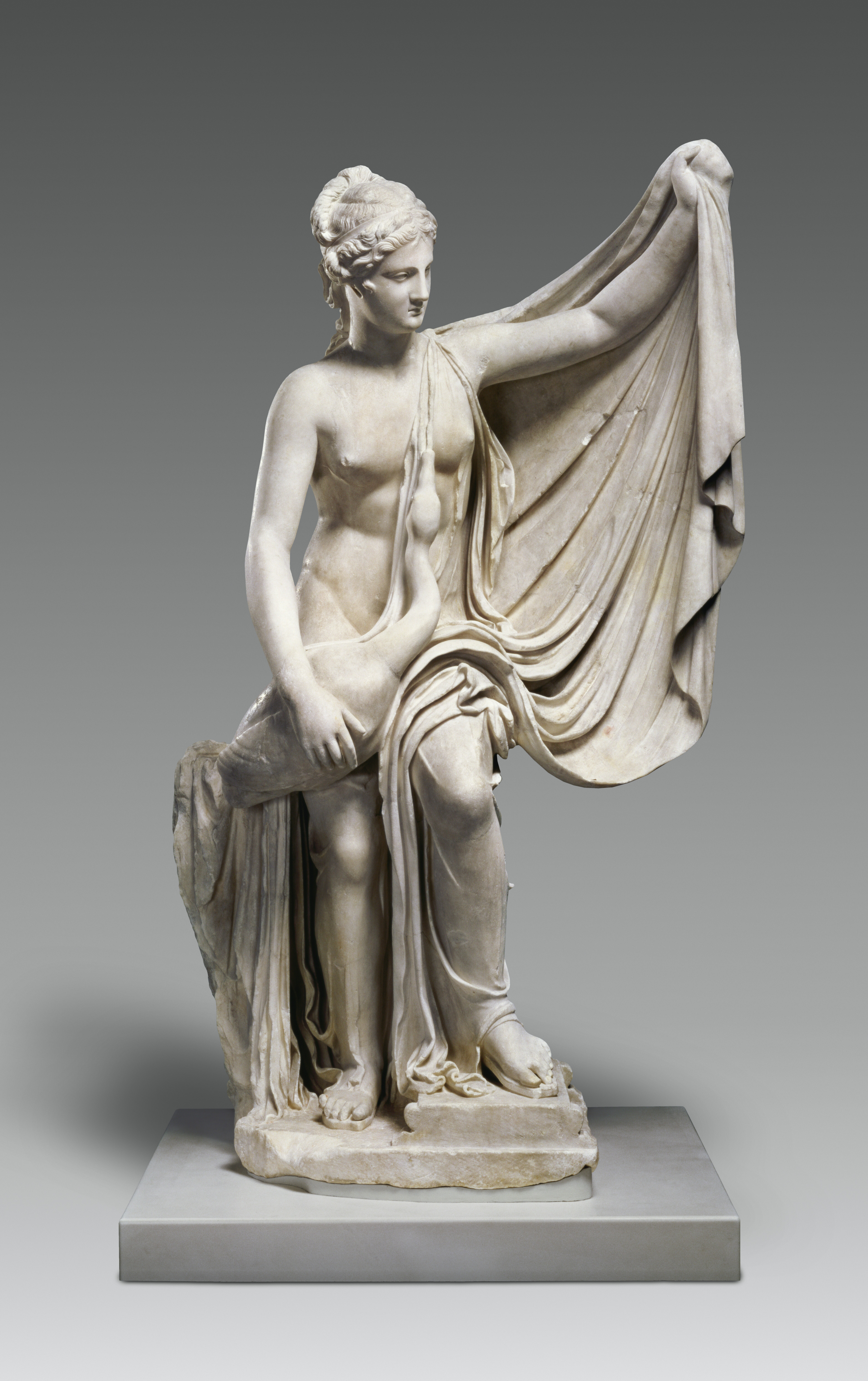
1st-century sculpture of Leda and the Swan in the Getty Villa

Myths surrounding Leda typically concern her seduction by Zeus and the birth of her children Helen, Clytemnestra, and Castor and Pollux. While she was married to Tyndareus, Zeus began to covet her. In order to take her without alerting his wife Hera, Zeus devised a plot. He shapeshifted and pretended to be an injured swan fleeing from an eagle, which he used as a pretext to fall into Leda's lap, where he then assaulted her. Hyginus writes that this event took place near the river Eurotas. Later the same day, Leda laid with Tyndareus as well. Memorably, Helen and Pollux were children of Zeus, and Clytemnestra and Castor were children of Tyndareus. Leda is commonly described as giving birth to a set of two eggs: one that Helen and Pollux emerged from, and one that Castor and Clytemnestra emerged from. However, some accounts do not mention Leda laying eggs.

Another version of the myth states that the goddess Nemesis (Νέμεσις) was instead the mother of Helen, and was also impregnated by Zeus in the guise of a swan. After copulating with Zeus, she laid an egg; a shepherd found the egg and gave it to Leda, who carefully kept it in a chest until the egg hatched. Helen was born from the egg, and Leda raised her as her own daughter. Zeus commemorated the birth of Helen by creating the constellation Cygnus (Κύκνος).

== In art ==
Leda and the Swan, Leda and the Egg, and Leda with her children were and continue to be popular subjects in the arts; they were particularly popular during the Classical period and the Renaissance. Leda has been depicted by Leonardo da Vinci, Cy Twombly, Edouard Houssin, Salvador Dali, Raphael, Peter Paul Rubens, and Michelangelo. She is also the main subject of Honoré Desmond Sharrer's "Leda & the Folks," a large, surrealist oil painting that depicts portraits of both Leda and Elvis Presley's parents. Australian artist Sidney Nolan produced at least a dozen interpretations of Leda and the Swan in the 1950s and 1960s, connected with his work on the myths of the Trojan War and World War I.

She is the subject of William Butler Yeats' Modernist poem Leda and the Swan. The myth was referenced in the premise of Eli Goldstone's 2017 novel Strange Heart Beating, which takes its name from Yeats' poem. In October 2022, the myth inspired Hozier to write a song in response to the Dobbs v. Jackson decision by the Supreme Court of the United States, which repealed Roe v. Wade. The song is called Swan Upon Leda.
