= Alita =

Alita may refer to:

== Fictional characters ==
- Alita, a character from the 1951 American film Flight to Mars
- Alita (Battle Angel Alita) (Japanese: ガリィ, romanized: Gally), the main character from a Japanese manga series
  - Battle Angel Alita (Japanese: 銃夢, romanized: Gunnm), the Japanese manga series, starring the eponymous Alita
    - Battle Angel (OVA), sometimes called "Alita", anime based on the manga
  - Alita: Battle Angel, an American film based on the manga series

== People ==
- Alita (singer), stylised ALITA, Australian pop singer, mentee in the 2023–2024 WOMADelaide x NSS Academy
- Alita Fahey, Australian actress
- Alita Guillen (born 1970), U.S. reporter
- Alita Román (1912–1989), Argentine film actress

== Other uses ==
- Alita, Lithuania (Belarusian: Аліта, romanized: Alita), a Belarusian name for the city of Alytus
- Alita Limited, a Bangladeshi cycle manufacturing company, the second largest cycle exporter of the country
- Alita (company), a liquor company in Alytus, Lithuania
- BC Alita, a former basketball club in Alytus, Lithuania

== See also ==
- Aelita (disambiguation)
- Elita (disambiguation)
- Aleta (disambiguation)
- Altia
- BC Alytus, a basketball club which succeeded BC Alita
