= Strange Heart Beating =

2017 novel by Eli Goldstone

- Author: Eli Goldstone
- Language: English
- Genre: Literary fiction
- Published: May 4, 2017 (Granta Books)
- Media type: Print (paperback)
- Pages: 208pp
- ISBN: 1783783494
- OCLC: 992450880

Strange Heart Beating is the debut novel of Eli Goldstone, published in 2017 by Granta Books. The title of the novel comes from W.B. Yeats' 1923 sonnet "Leda and the Swan". The protagonist of the novel, Seb, travels to Latvia to learn more about his wife, Leda, recently deceased in a freak accident involving a swan. The inspiration for the novel came to the author while pursuing a creative writing masters' degree when she took a trip to Latvia, where along with neighbouring Lithuania she has ancestral links. Goldstone has characterised writing the novel as her way of dealing with her negative obsession with death.

In a review for The Financial Times, Catherine Taylor said that the novel "with its savage yet comforting undercurrent of a swan as an emblem of the soul reborn, is an ardent examination of loss". John Harding called out the story in The Daily Mail for being "a variation of a well-worn plot" that "grows increasingly bonkers" but concluded that "it’s an enjoyable trip, wryly amusing and touching". In The Herald, reviewer Alastair Mabbott found the novel's "bleak" tone "often makes it hard to persevere with". It was featured in The Guardian's 150-strong "Not the Booker prize 2017" longlist, but did not make the 5-novel shortlist.
