= Amelita =

== People ==
- Amelita Galli-Curci (1882-1963), Italian soprano
- Amelita Ramos (1927), wife of Fidel V. Ramos, the twelfth President of the Philippines
- Amelita Ward (1923–1987), American film actress
- Amelita Baltar (born 1940), Argentine singer

== Music ==
- Amelita (Court Yard Hounds album)
