= Padomju Jaunatne =

Latvian newspaper

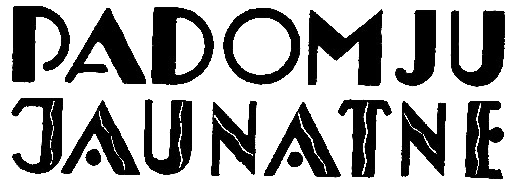
- Type: Daily newspaper
- Owner: Leninist Young Communist League of Latvia
- Founded: 27 September 1944
- Ceased publication: 30 December 1993
- Language: Latvian
- Headquarters: Riga, Latvia
- OCLC number: 22687859

Padomju Jaunatne (Soviet Youth) was a daily newspaper for young people published in Latvia between 1944 and 1993.

== History ==
Padomju Jaunatne was published by the Leninist Young Communist League of Latvia (LĻKJS), the branch of the all-Union Komsomol in the Latvian Soviet Socialist Republic. It served as an organ of the LĻKJS until the organization's dissolution in 1991, but continued to be published under the new title, Latvijas Jaunatne (Latvian Youth) until late 1993.
