= Lita (surname) =

Lita and Liță are surnames. Notable people with these surnames include:

- Adriana Lita, Materials scientist
- Cătălin Liță (born 1975), Romanian footballers
- Emilia Liță (born 1933). Romanian gymnast
- Leroy Lita (born 1984), Congo football player
- Selina Jahan Lita, Bangladesh Awami League politician and Member of Parliament
