= Casa del Citarista =

Ancient Pompeian house

Coordinates: 40°44′59″N 14°29′20″E

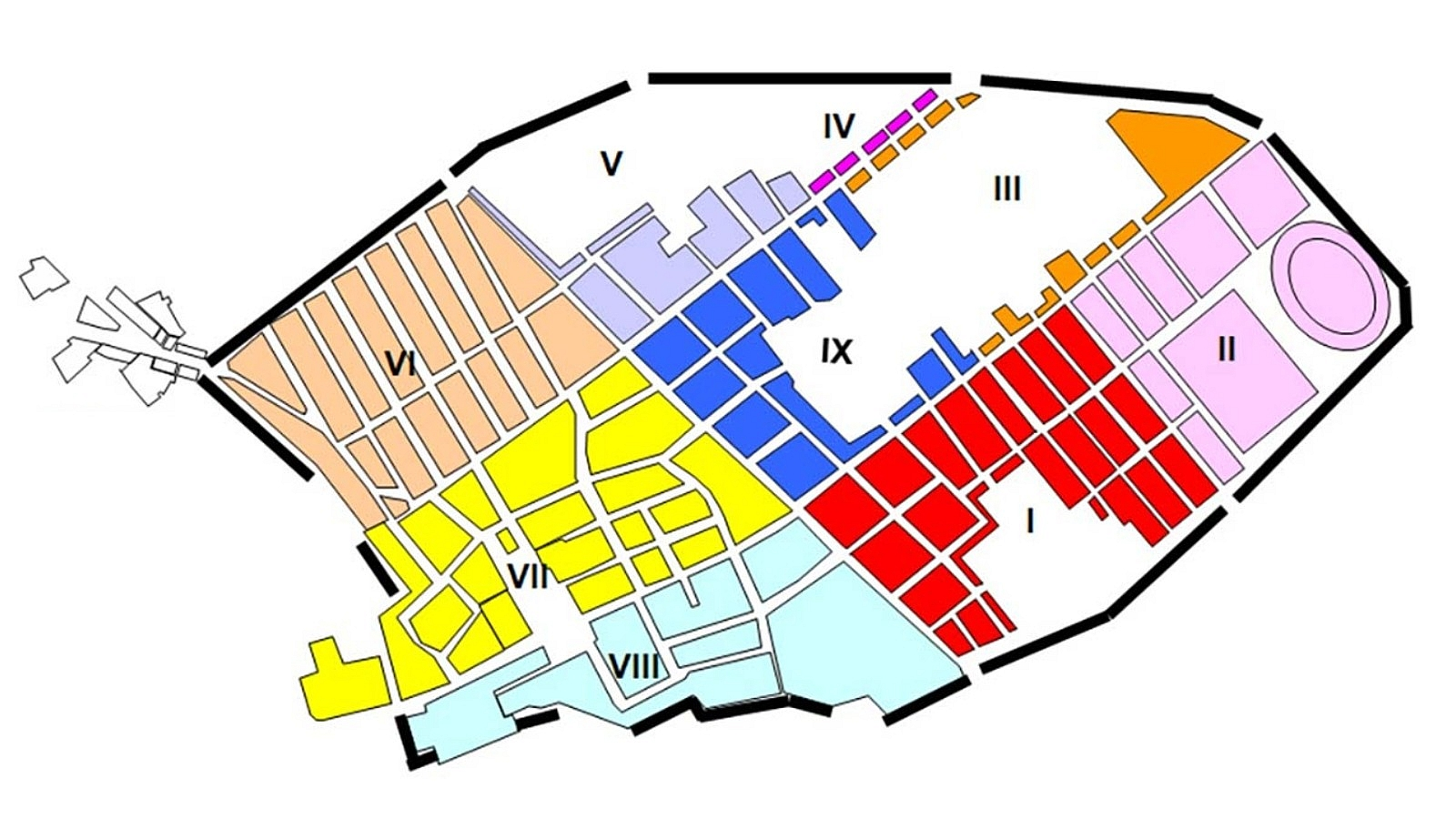
Site plan of ancient Pompeii; Casa del Citarista is located in the far left corner of Regio I (in red)

Casa del Citarista (House of the Citharist or House of the Kitharist) is a large residential property located at I.4.5/25 in the ancient city of Pompeii. It was named for the bronze statue of Apollo playing the cithara found in the central peristyle. Located at the intersection of the Via dell'Abbondanza and the Via Stabiana, the Casa del Citarista was a wealthy residence as evidenced by its notable wall paintings, mosaics, and bronze statues -- all of a high quality.

The house is approximately 2700 m² (29,000 ft²) and was created by combing at least two smaller residences. Its most notable feature are its three peristyles split across two levels, with the upper peristyle standing nearly two meters (six feet) above the middle (room 17) and lower peristyles. The peristyles were connected by a staircase in antiquity. Other notable features of the house include its two entrances: 1) at I.4.5 on the Via dell'Abbondanza and 2) at I.4.25 opening to the Via Stabiana.

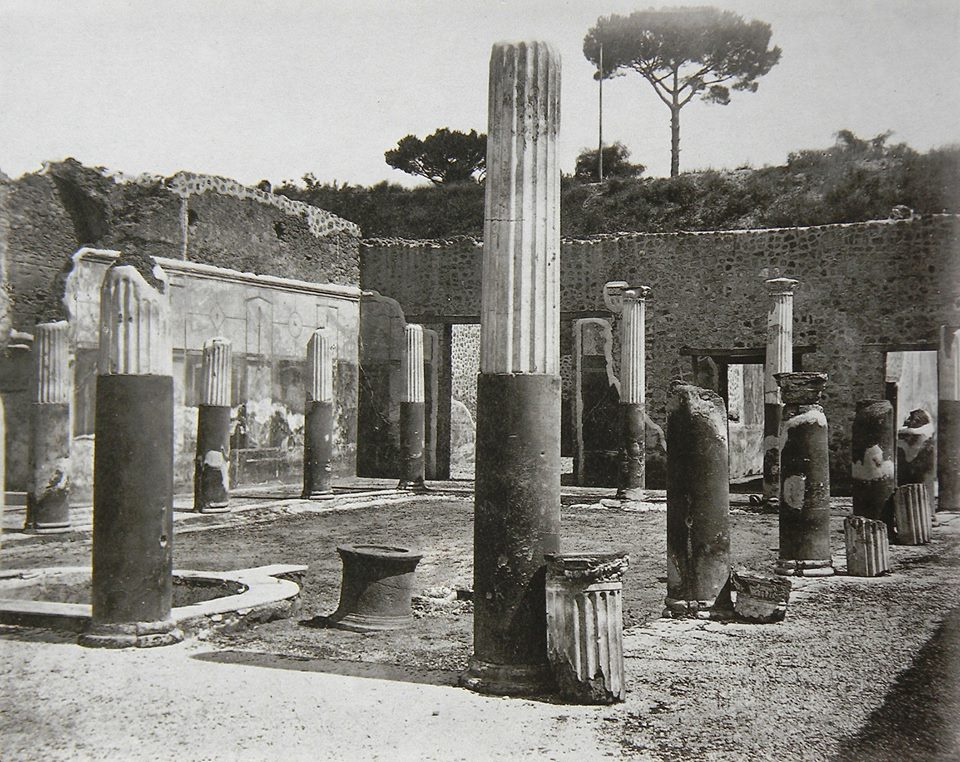
Casa del Citarista in 1873, middle peristyle (room 17), Pompeii I.4.5/25

== House history ==
The Casa del Citarista was originally excavated from 1853-1861, which was followed by subsequent excavations in 1868, 1872, and 1929. Due to its original excavation dates, the house was not excavated according to the standards of modern excavation sites. Many of the building's decorative elements were removed and placed in storage in the museums at Pompeii and Naples for preservation purposes.

The house was narrowly missed in the autumn of 1943 bombing campaign by the Allied forces that damaged many of the houses along the Via dell'Abbondanza, including the House of the Faun and the forum.

=== Ancient history ===
The oldest part of the Casa del Citarista originally dates to the third century BCE, constructed when Pompeii was still under Samnite control. The original "core" of the house likely consisted of an atrium, triclinium, tablinum, and a series of cubicula --- all characteristics of the stereotypical domus (atrium house) outlined by Vitruvius in his De Architectura. This may have been the combination of rooms located at entrance I.4.5 on the Via dell'Abbondanza (the north part of the house) or the rooms at entrance I.4.25 on the Via Stabiana (west side).

The two houses were likely joined together after the earthquake of 62 CE, when the staircase between the upper and middle peristyles (rooms 56 and 17) was constructed. After this union, the house may have served as a semi-rentable entertainment space, with certain areas of the building (namely the two southern peristyles) being open to use by members of the public for a fee. These quasi-entertainment spaces were richly decorated, featuring some of the highest quality wall paintings preserved in the house.

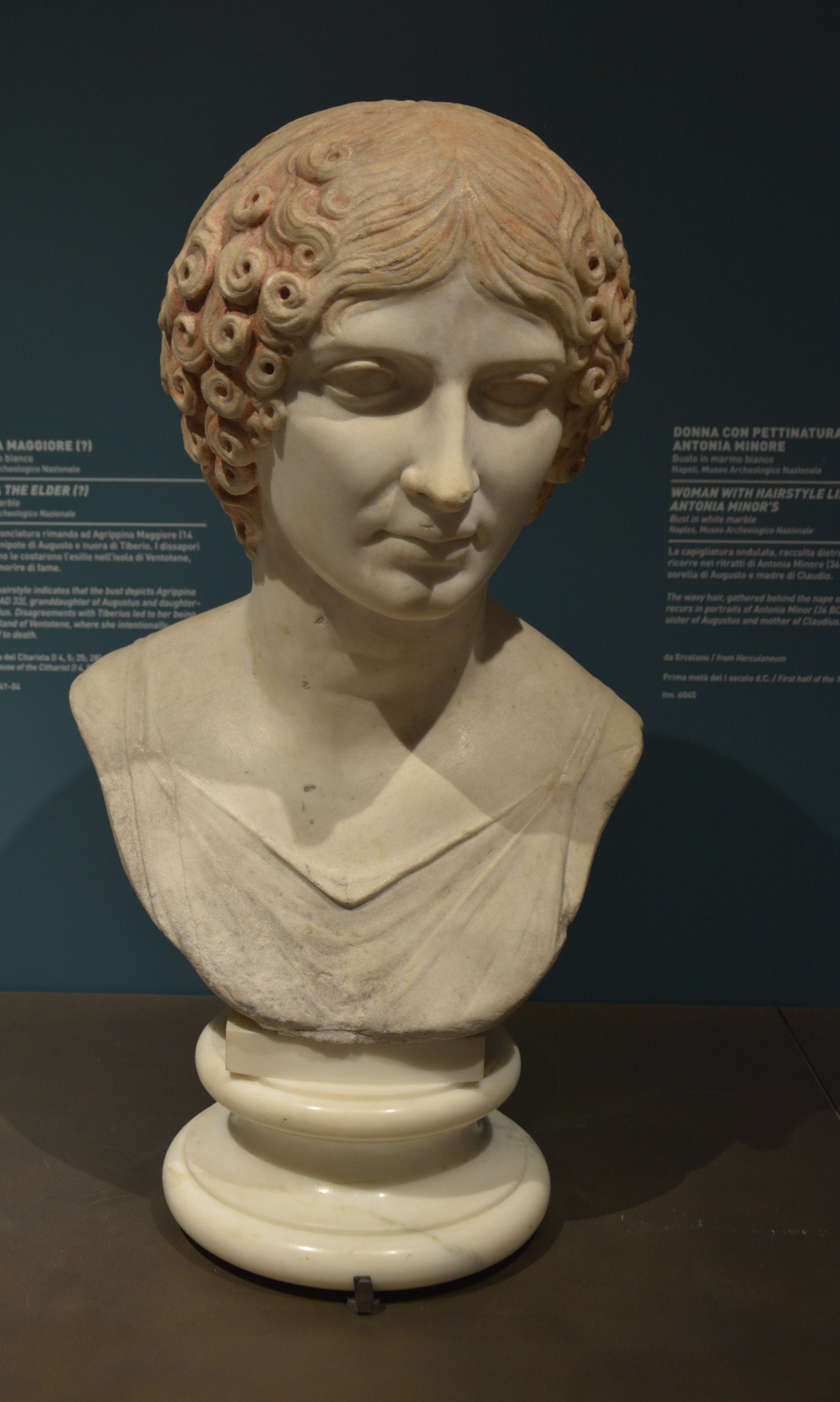
Bust of Agrippina the Elder (?), first century CE, marble, Casa del Citarista (I.4.5/25), room 17, Naples Archaeological Museum

=== Connections to the Popidii family ===
While the ownership of many houses in Pompeii is lost to history, evidence has been uncovered to suggest that the Casa del Citarista belonged to the wealthy Popidii gens in 79 CE. Election graffiti was unearthed in the house's excavations that referenced the Popidii family, one of the oldest families in Pompeii (dating back to the Samnite period) with strong historical political ties to the city. Two bronze busts were also unearthed in the middle peristyle (room 17), which may depict two members of the Popidii family. Some sources claim that two marble busts of L. Popidius Secundus Augustianus and L. Popidius Ampliatus were excavated in the middle peristyle (room 17) in 1861, further tying the house to the Popidii family. One marble bust now in the Naples Archaeological Museum found in the middle peristyle has been tentatively identified as Agrippina the Elder (died 33 CE) based on hairstyle and facial features. The marble bust was included in "Pompeii: the Exhibition" at the Portland Art Museum in 2017 where the object label read:

"Scholars believe this bust is of Agrippina the Elder, mother of the Roman Emperor Caligula. This attribution was made through comparisons of royal portraiture and coins minted in her likeness. Evidence further points to Agrippina the Elder through her distinctive hairstyle. The complex knot of braids, overlapping curls, and the classical central part was her hallmark. As she was known throughout Rome as a great woman, women mimicked her likeness. This sculpture still has remnants of red paint that once covered the hair."

== Decoration and finds ==
Numerous objects of notable quality were found in the Casa del Citarista excavations, many of which are now housed in the Naples Archaeological Museum.

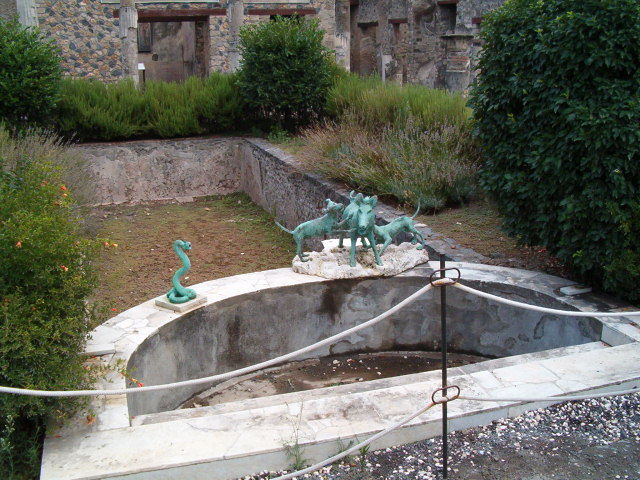
Semicircular fountain pool in the middle peristyle (room 17) of the Casa del Citarista. Includes replicas of the animal bronze statues.

=== Bronze sculptures ===
Four bronze sculptures of animals were found in the middle peristyle (room 17) of the Casa del Citarista. These sculptures surrounded the central fountain area in the peristyle and consisted of a snake, hunting dog, boar, lion and a stag. The snake served as the fountain spigot and was placed at the end of the semicircular pool. A half-scale bronze sculpture of the Apollo Citharoedus (Apollo playing the cithara) type was found in peristyle 17 as well, giving the Casa del Citarista its name. The Apollo statue was recorded as being in the Naples Archaeological Museum in November 1853, so it was discovered shortly after excavations in the house began. The sculpture is based on an Ancient Greek original and was found missing its cithara.

=== Wall paintings ===
The main panel paintings were removed from the Casa del Citarista, as was the custom in the nineteenth century. Ancient frescoes are sensitive to light and water, so they were physically removed from their original locations for preservation. While most rooms in the house were decorated with some pigment, large panels featuring mythological scenes were contained to the triclinia (dining rooms) and other entertainment spaces. Notable subjects included Mars and Venus (Aeneas and Dido?), Iphigenia in Tauris, and Leda and the swan. The paintings found in rooms 19 (triclinium), 20 (cubiculum), 21 (exedra), and 35 (triclinium) are large compared to other Pompeian frescoes, each measuring more than two meters (six feet) in height.

=== Rooms 19, 20, and 21 ===
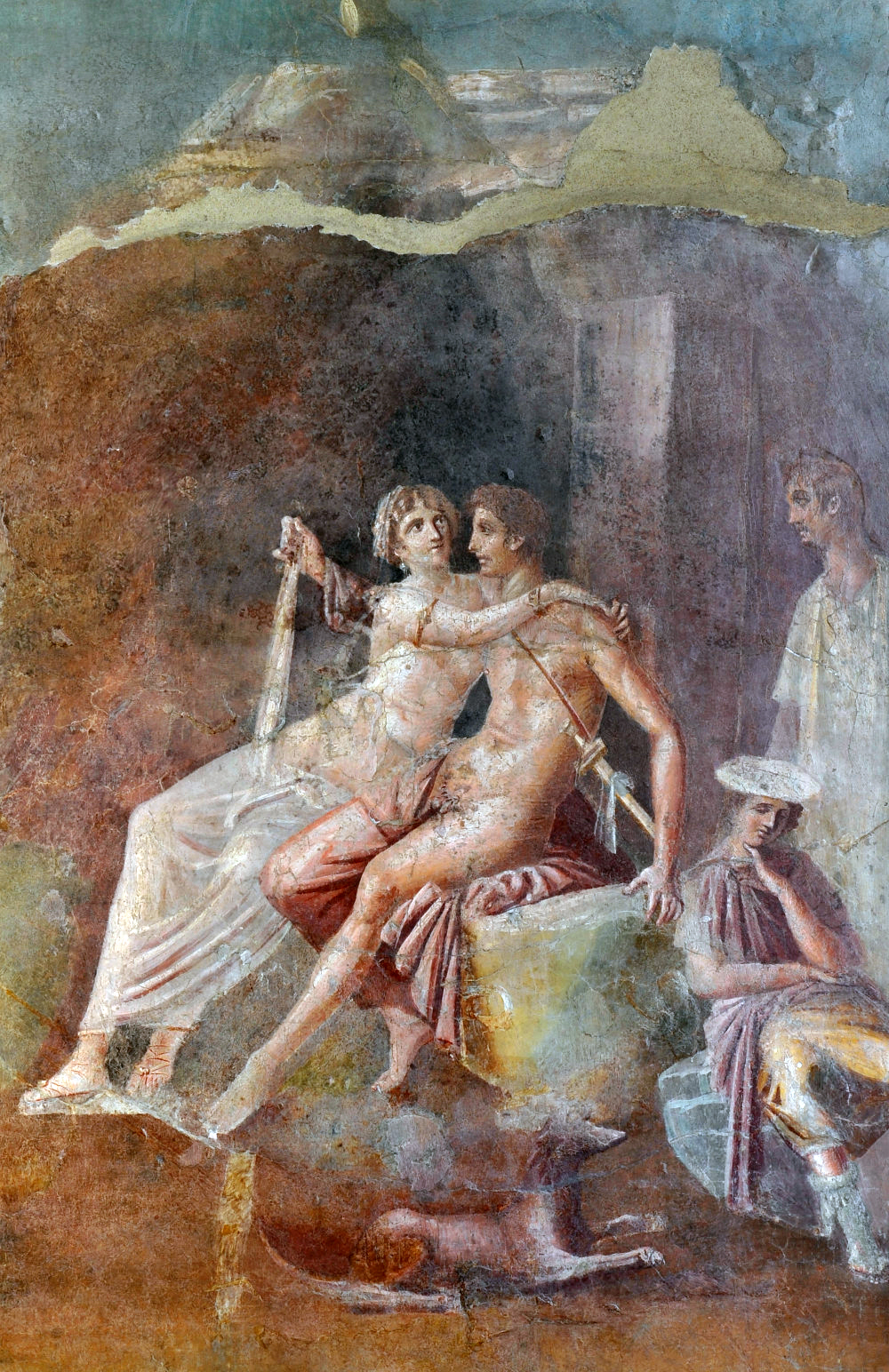
Mars and Venus (Aeneas and Dido?), first century BCE/CE, Casa del Citarista (I.4.5/25), room 20, Naples Archaeological Museum

Five mythological panels were found in rooms 19 (triclinium), 20 (cubiculum), and 21 (exedra), all of which are now housed in the Naples Archaeological Museum. The panels are all of the Third Style and are believed to have been commissioned from 15-5 BCE or in 50 CE. Room 19 was dominated by black walls and contained a single painting depicting Antiope (south wall). Based on wall decorative patterns in other Roman houses, it is likely that there were two additional panels on the north and east walls of room 19 that are now lost. Room 20 was found to contain three mythological panels: Mars and Venus/Aeneas and Dido (north wall), Laomedon (east wall), and Leda and the swan (south wall). These panels were set against a red and yellow backdrop with Third Style architectural framing. Room 21 had a single panel painting depicting the Judgement of Paris set against black walls with yellow and red accents.

=== Room 23 ===
Located off of exedra 21, room 23 featured two wall paintings centered around a musical theme. One painting depicted Pindar and Corinna and other Apollo and Marsyas. There may have been a third panel in antiquity, but it has since been lost.

=== Room 35 ===
Room 35 (a large triclinium) was set off the lower peristyle (room 32) and featured two mythological paintings (it may have originally been three but one is now lost). The south wall originally housed a painting of Bacchus and Ariadne that is now on display in the Naples Archaeological Museum. Next to it, the east wall had a painting of Iphigenia in Tauris(featuring Orestes and Pylades). Both of these paintings were set against predominantly yellow walls.

=== Room 37 ===
Across the lower peristyle from room 35, triclinium 37 contained three additional mythological wall paintings. For the most part, these paintings are in worse condition than those in other parts of the house. The north wall panel depicted the lover Venus and Adonis, with Adonis reclined in a similar pose to the male lover in cubiculum 20. The west wall painting is the best preserved of the three and depicts Io, Hermes, and Hera. On the south wall is a very fragmentary depiction of Endymion (?). These paintings are all housed in the Naples Archaeological Museum.

=== Modern reconstructions ===
The Casa del Citarista was digitally reconstructed in 2014 by James Stanton-Abbott (Stanton-Abbott Associates, Boston, Massachusetts) for the exhibition "Götter, Mythen, Menschen" at the Bucerius Kunst Forum (Hamburg, 27 September 2014-11 January 2015). The reconstruction was later cited in an article by classical art historian Bettina Bergmann for the L’Association Internationale pour l’Étude de la Mosaïque Antique (AIEMA) North American Branch Colloquium, held at the Getty Villa in Malibu, California (2014). Images of the reconstruction can be accessed via Stanton-Abbott's Behance profile (see here).

In the early 2000s, the Pompeii Archaeological Park placed life-size reconstructions of the wall paintings in rooms 19, 20, and 21 in their original physical contexts. This can be seen in photographs from December 2006 on the Casa del Citarista's page on Pompeii in Pictures.

== Gallery ==
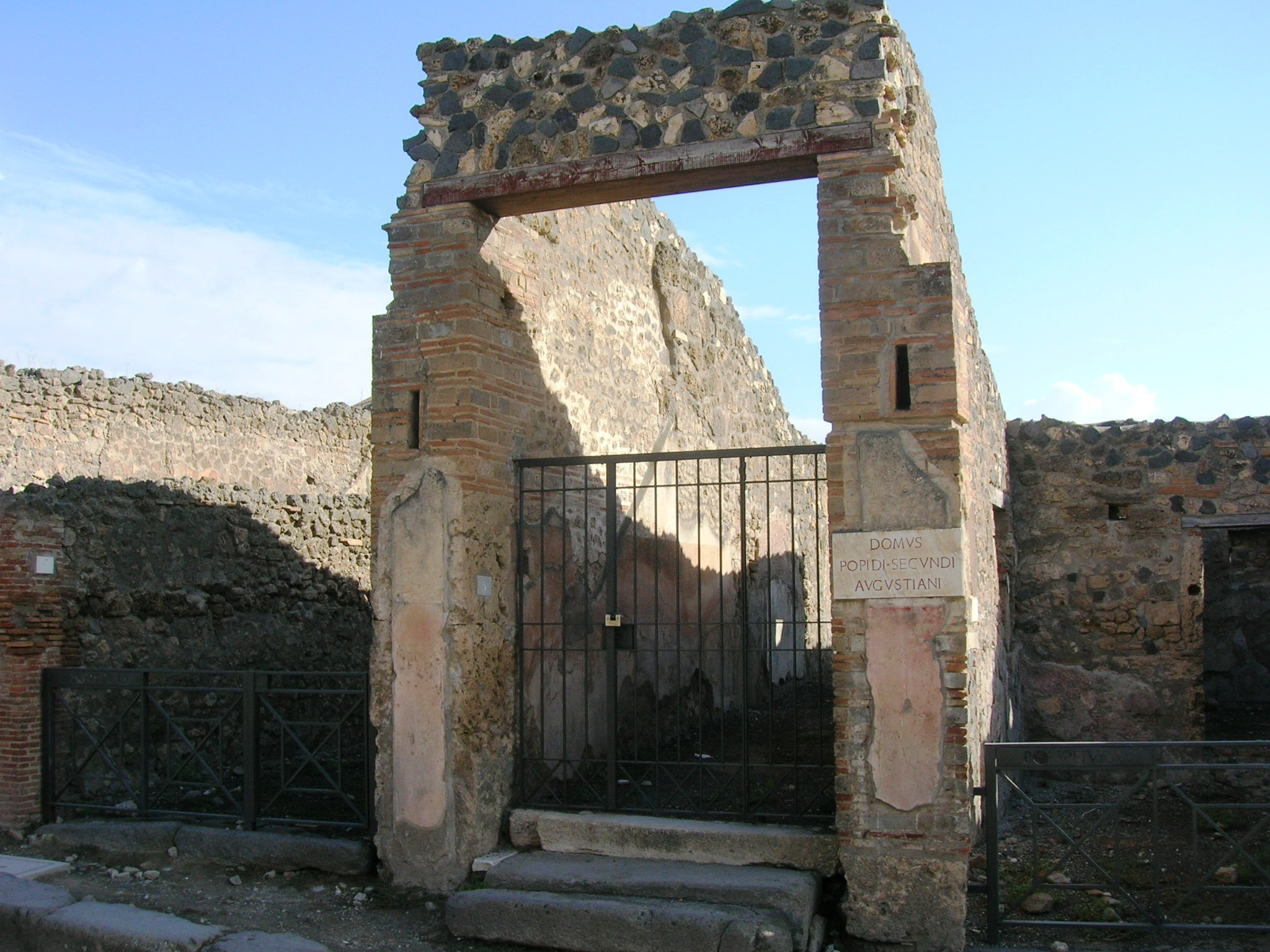
Entrance, I.4.5 (along the Via dell'Abbondanza)

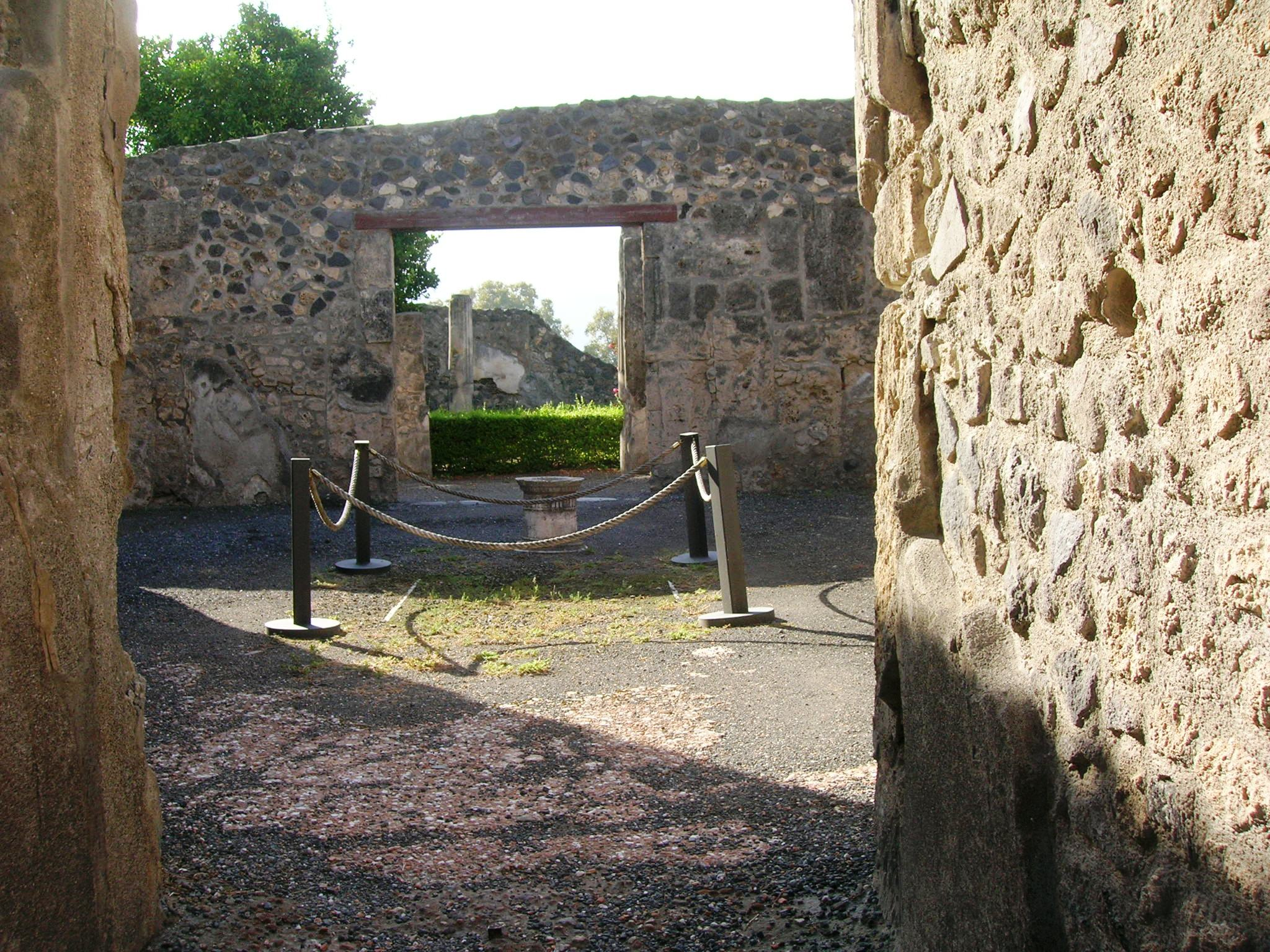
Atrium, Casa del Citarista (I.4.5/25)

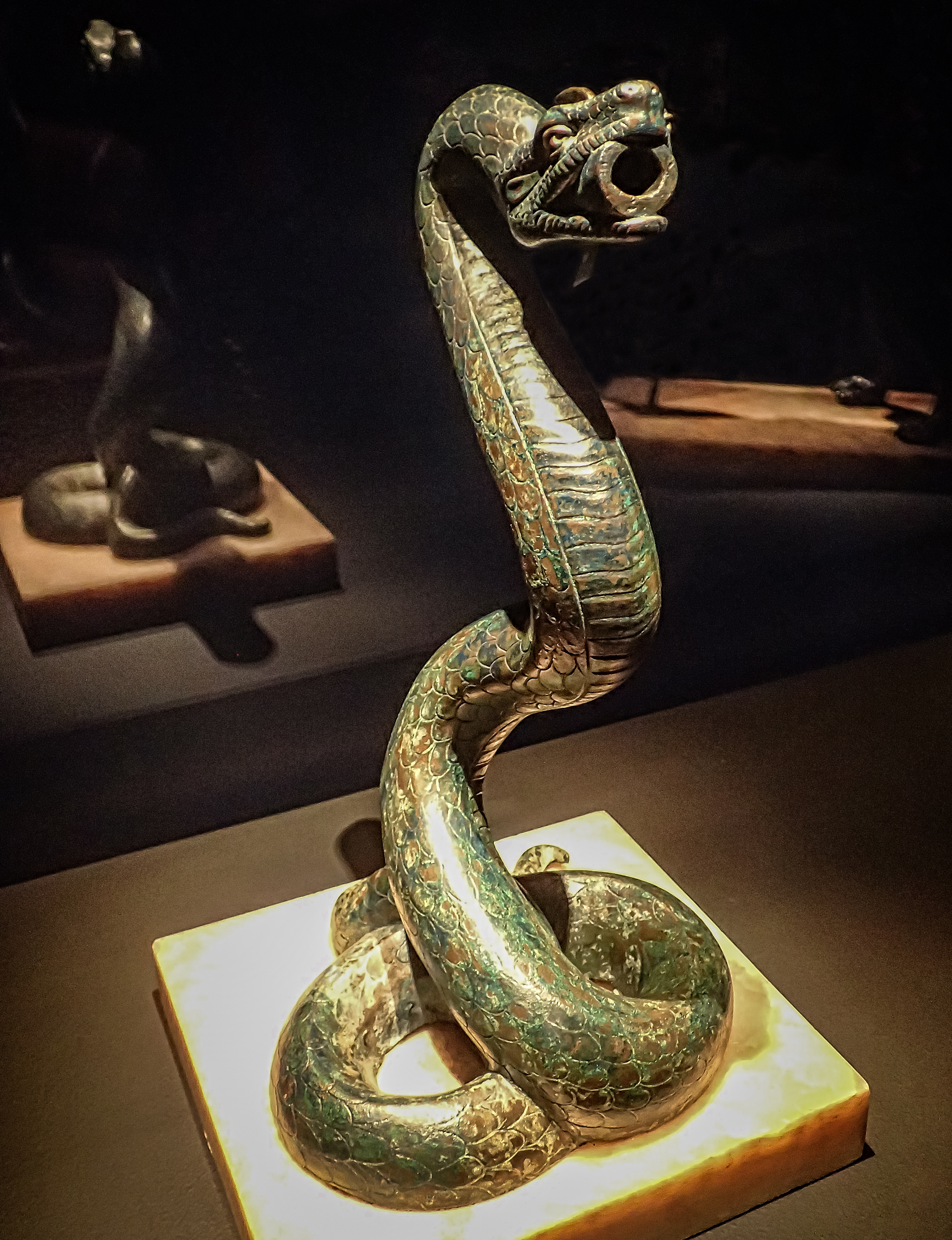
Sculpture of a serpent fountain feature, first century BCE, bronze, Casa del Citarista (I.4.5/25 -- room 17), Naples Archaeological Museum

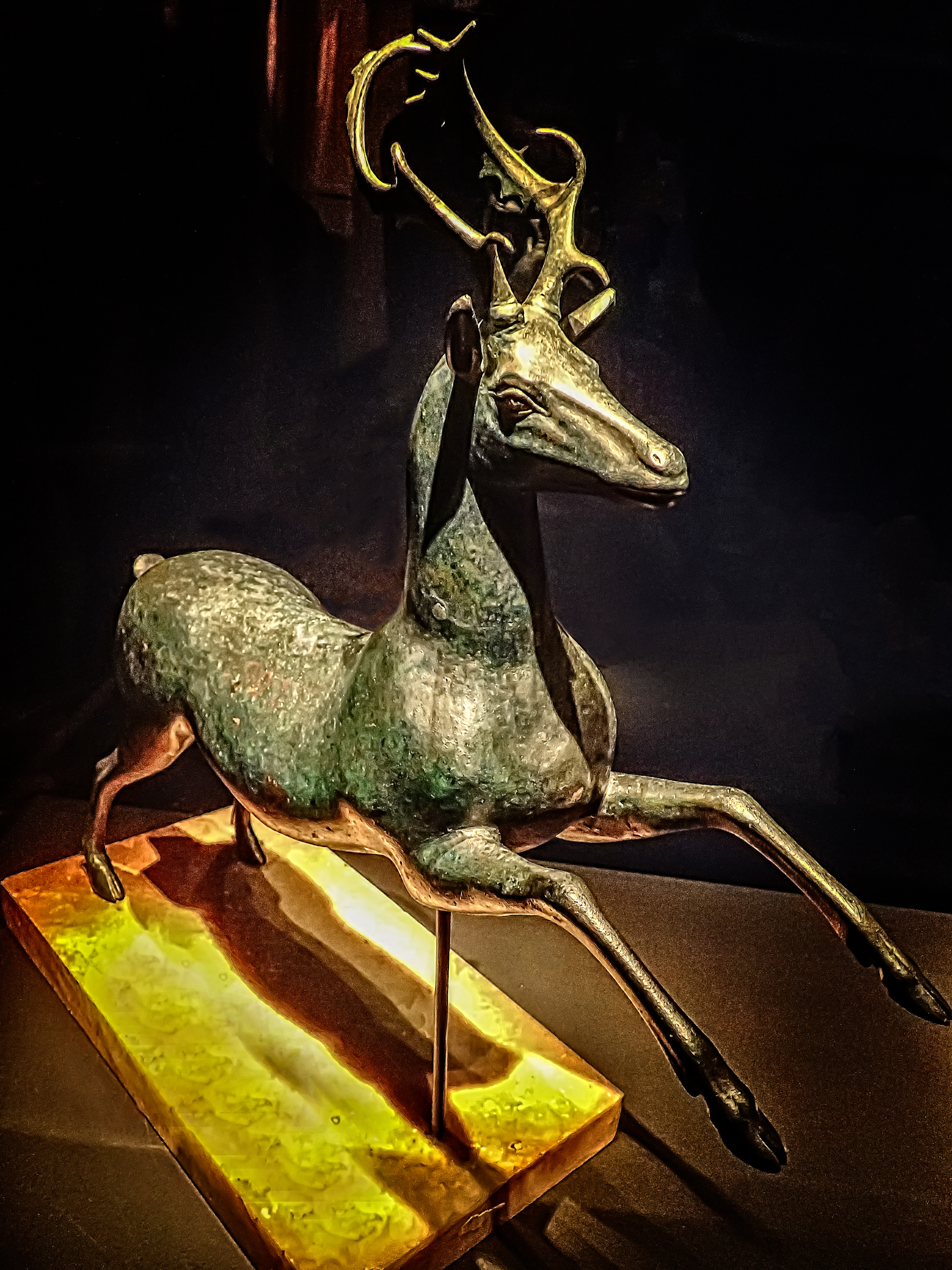
Sculpture of a stag, first century BCE, bronze, Casa del Citarista (I.4.5/25 -- room 17), Naples Archaeological Museum

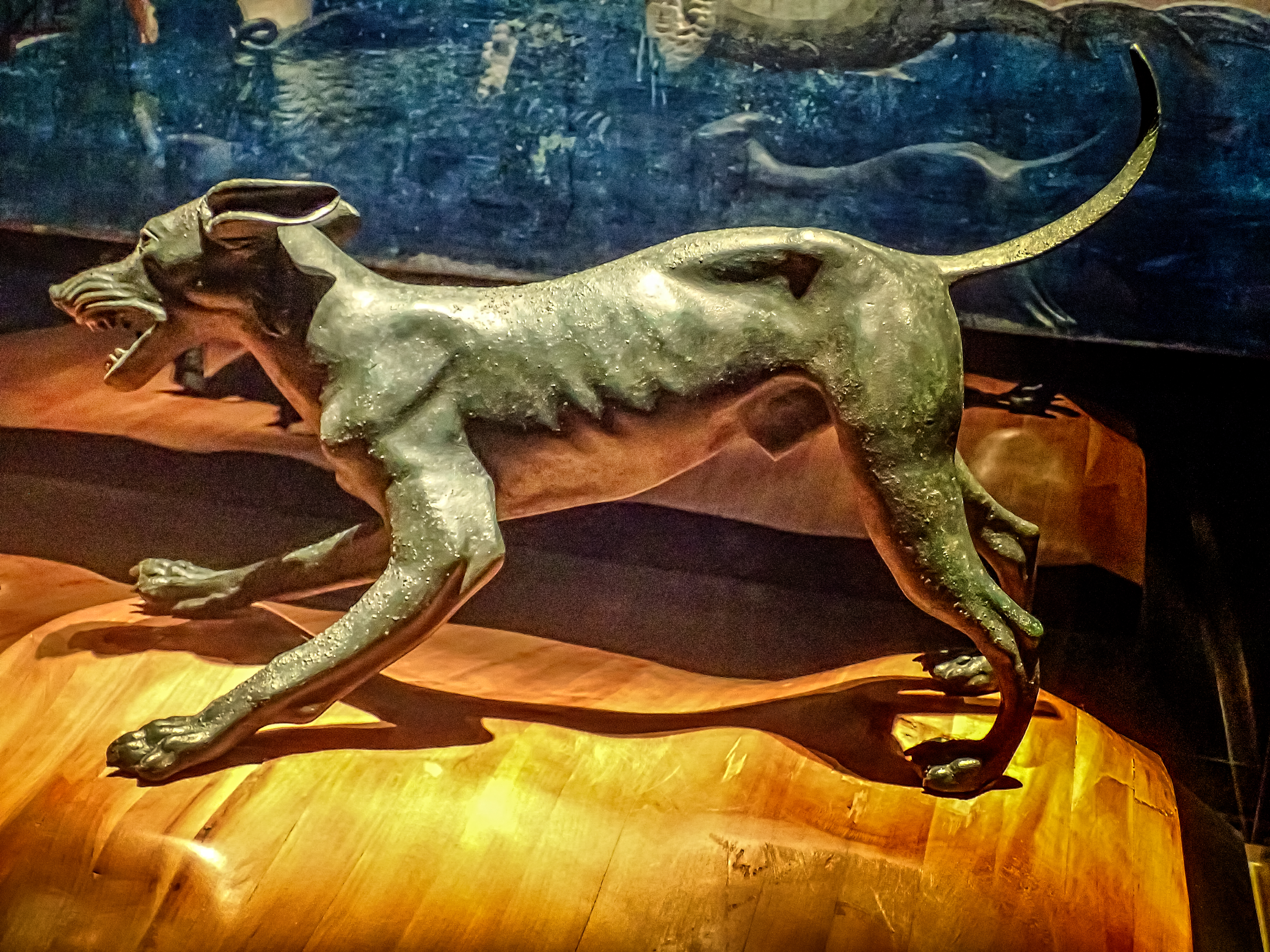
Sculpture of a dog, first century BCE, bronze, Casa del Citarista (I.4.5/25 -- room 17), Naples Archaeological Museum

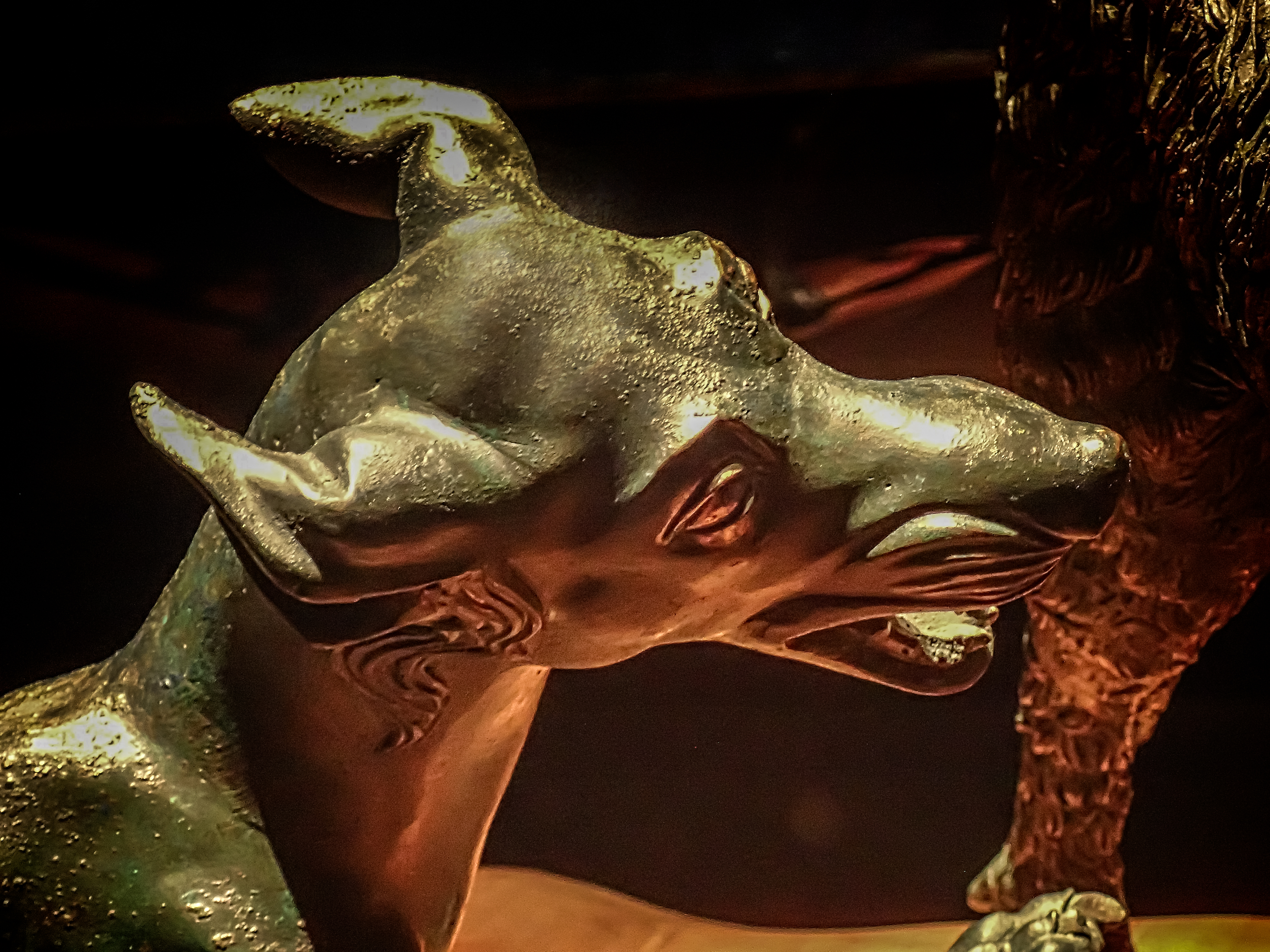
Sculpture of a dog (head), first century BCE, bronze, Casa del Citarista (I.4.5/25 -- room 17), Naples Archaeological Museum

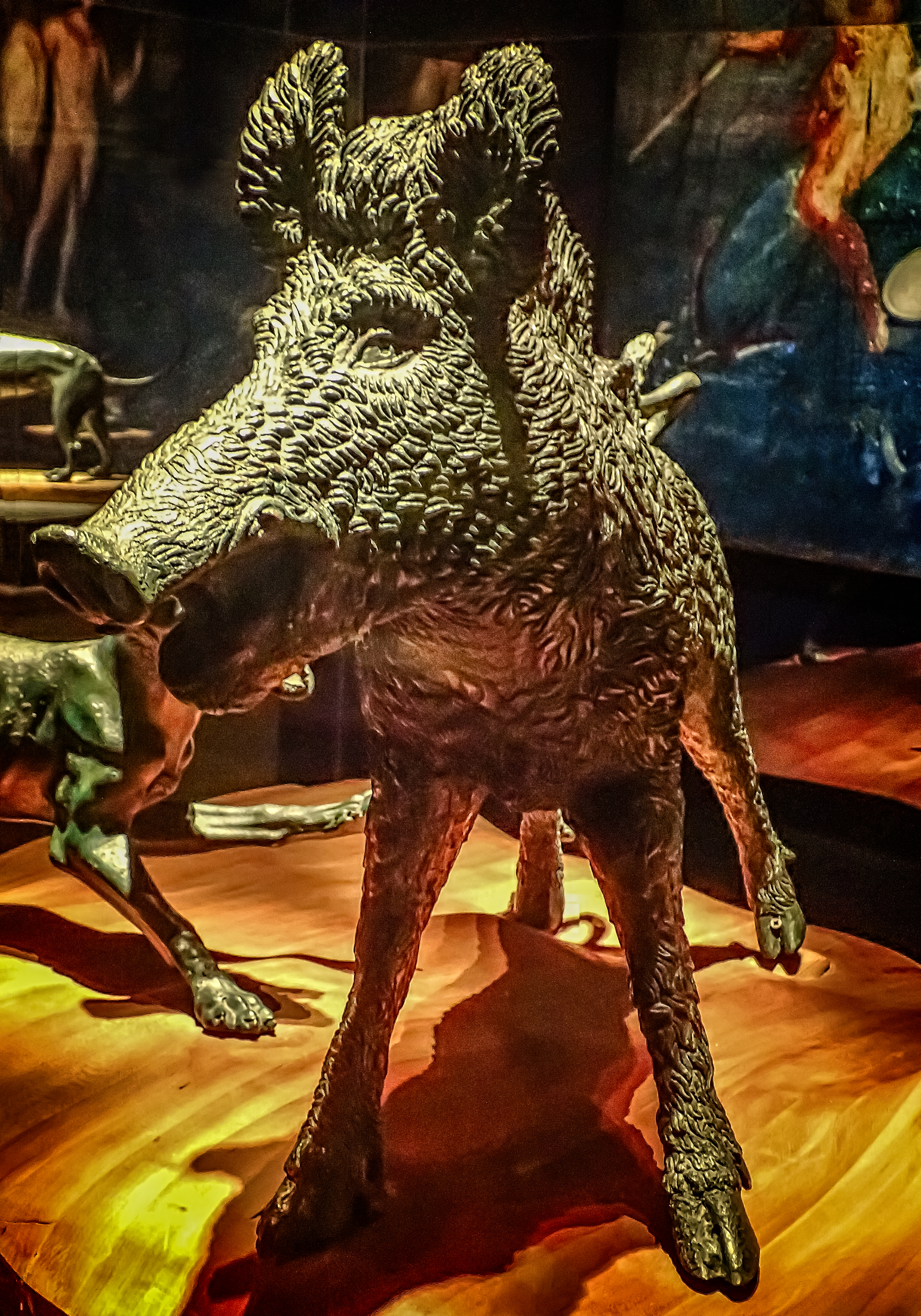
Sculpture of a boar, first century BCE, bronze, Casa del Citarista (I.4.5/25 -- room 17), Naples Archaeological Museum

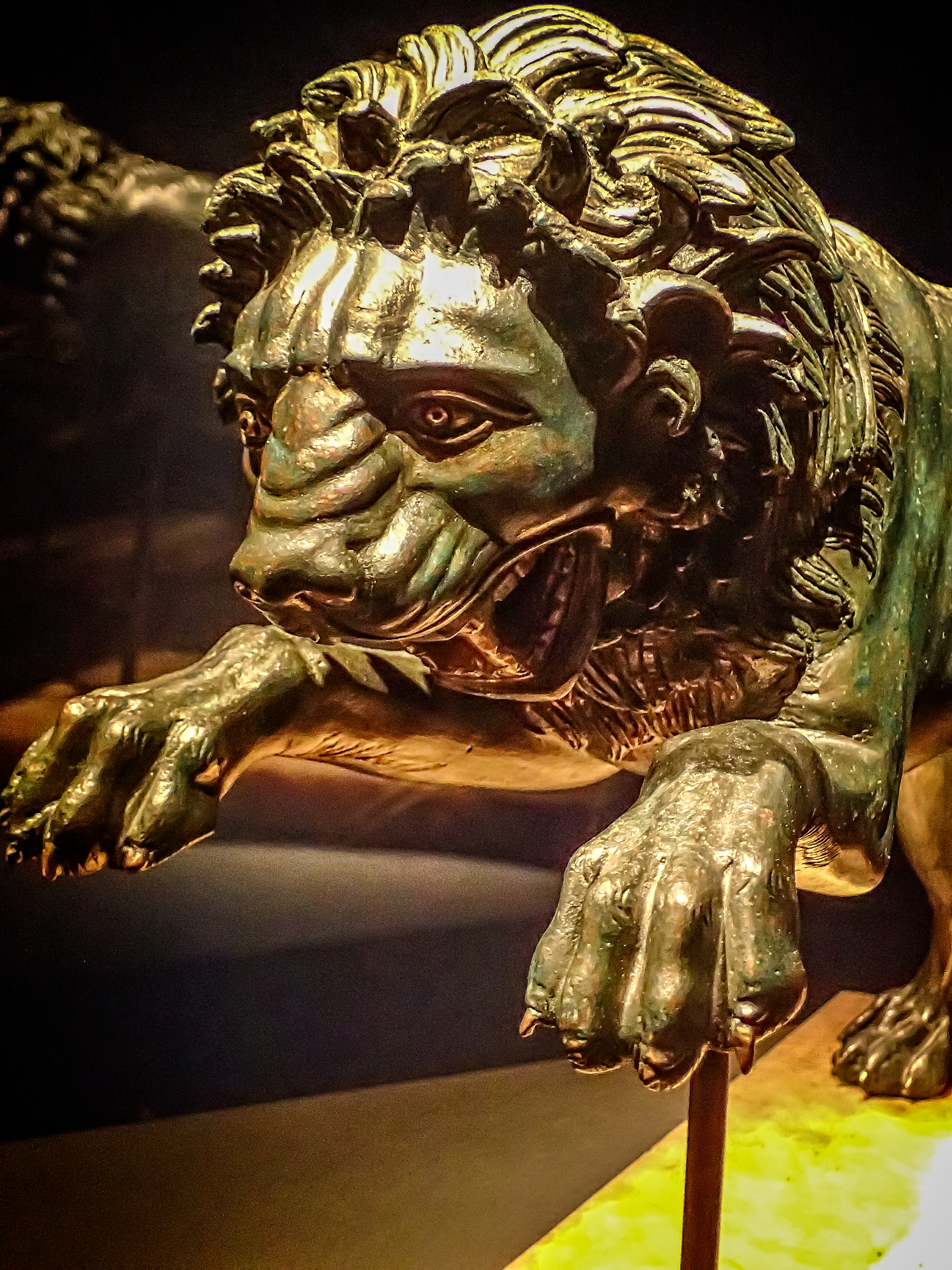
Sculpture of a lion, first century BCE, bronze, Casa del Citarista (I.4.5/25 -- room 17), Naples Archaeological Museum

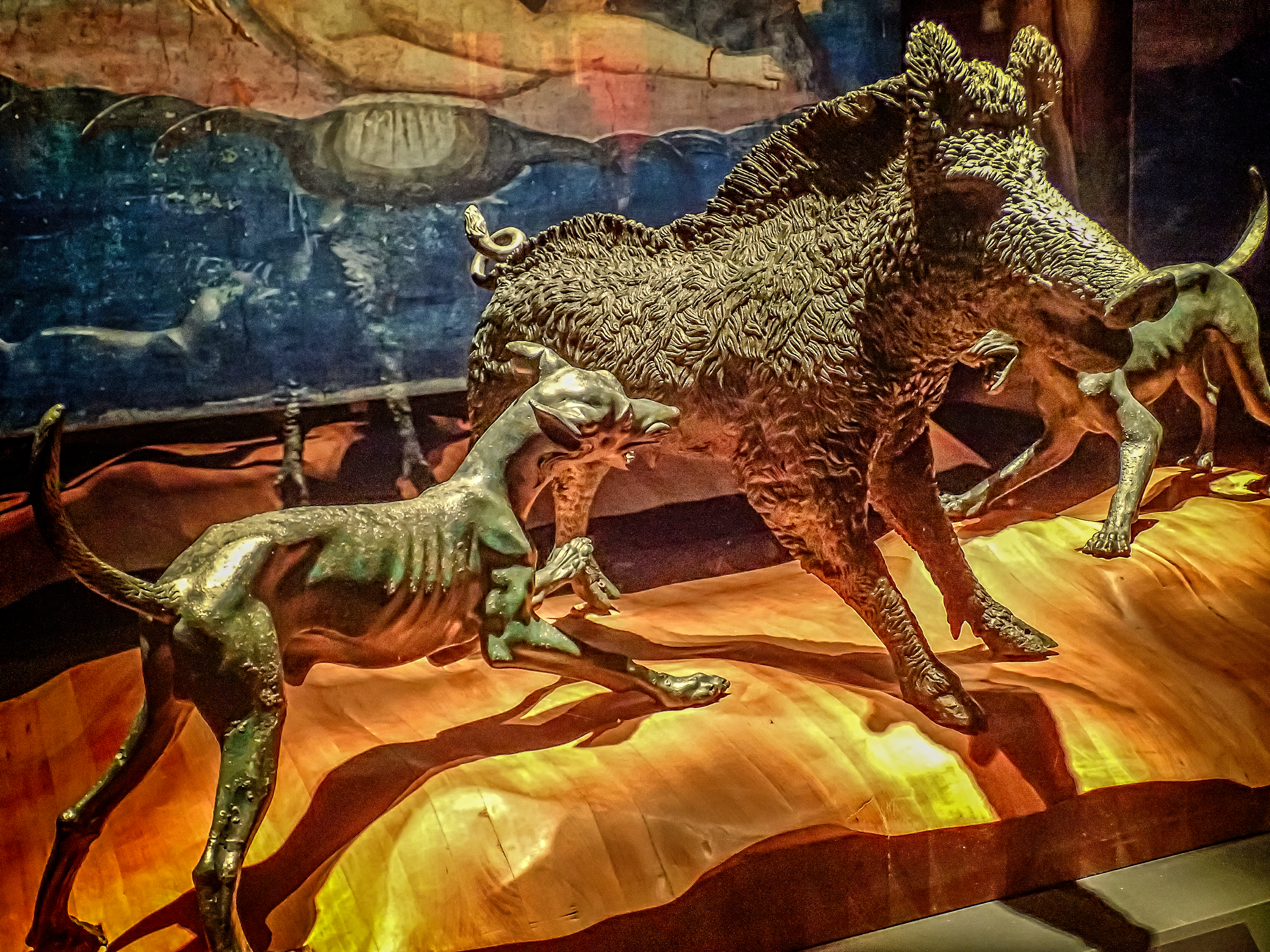
Bronze sculpture group from the middle peristyle (room 17), Casa del Citarista (I.4.5/25)

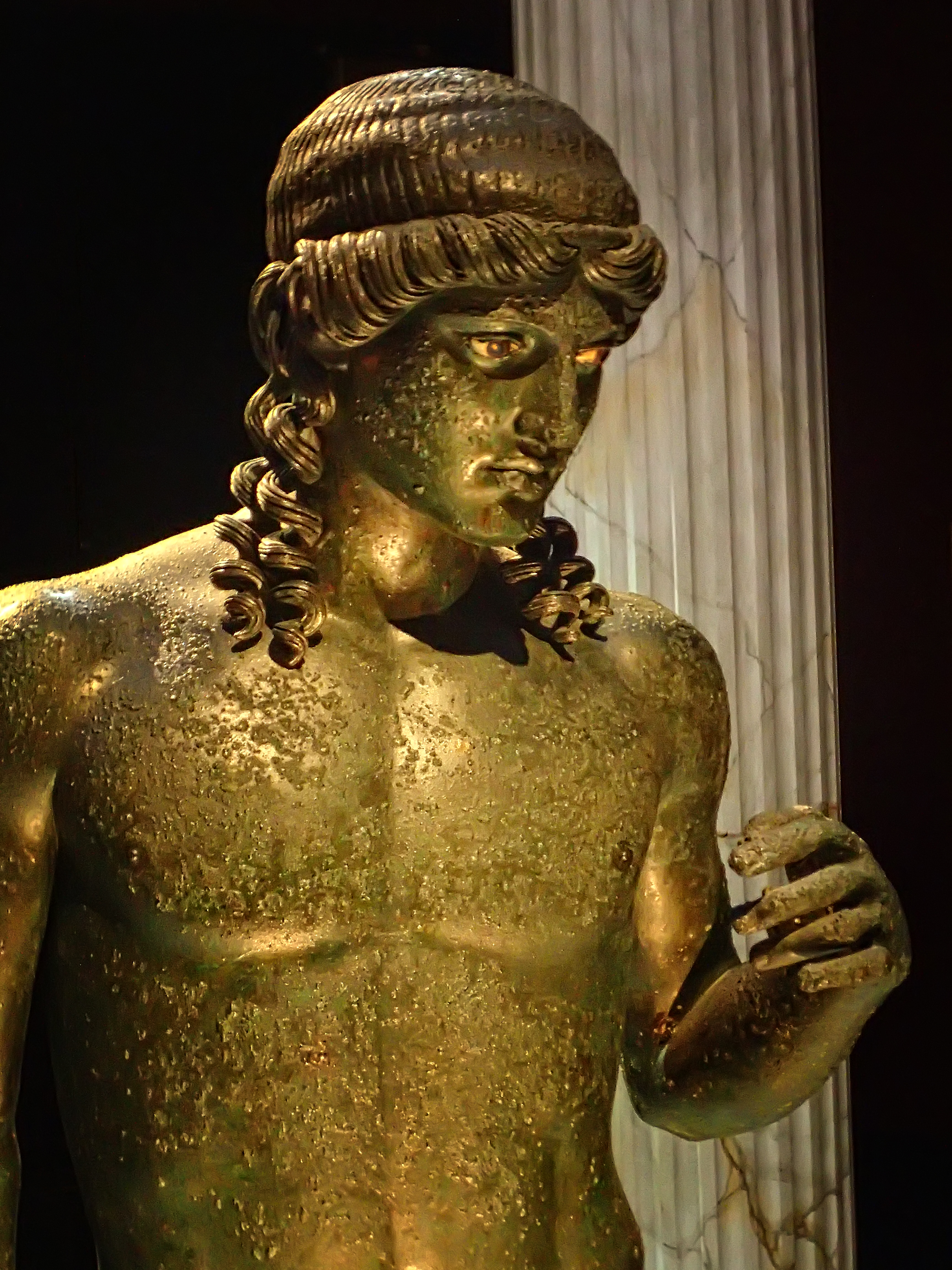
Apollo Citharoedus, first century CE, bronze, found in the Casa del Citarista (I.4.5/25), Naples Archaeological Museum

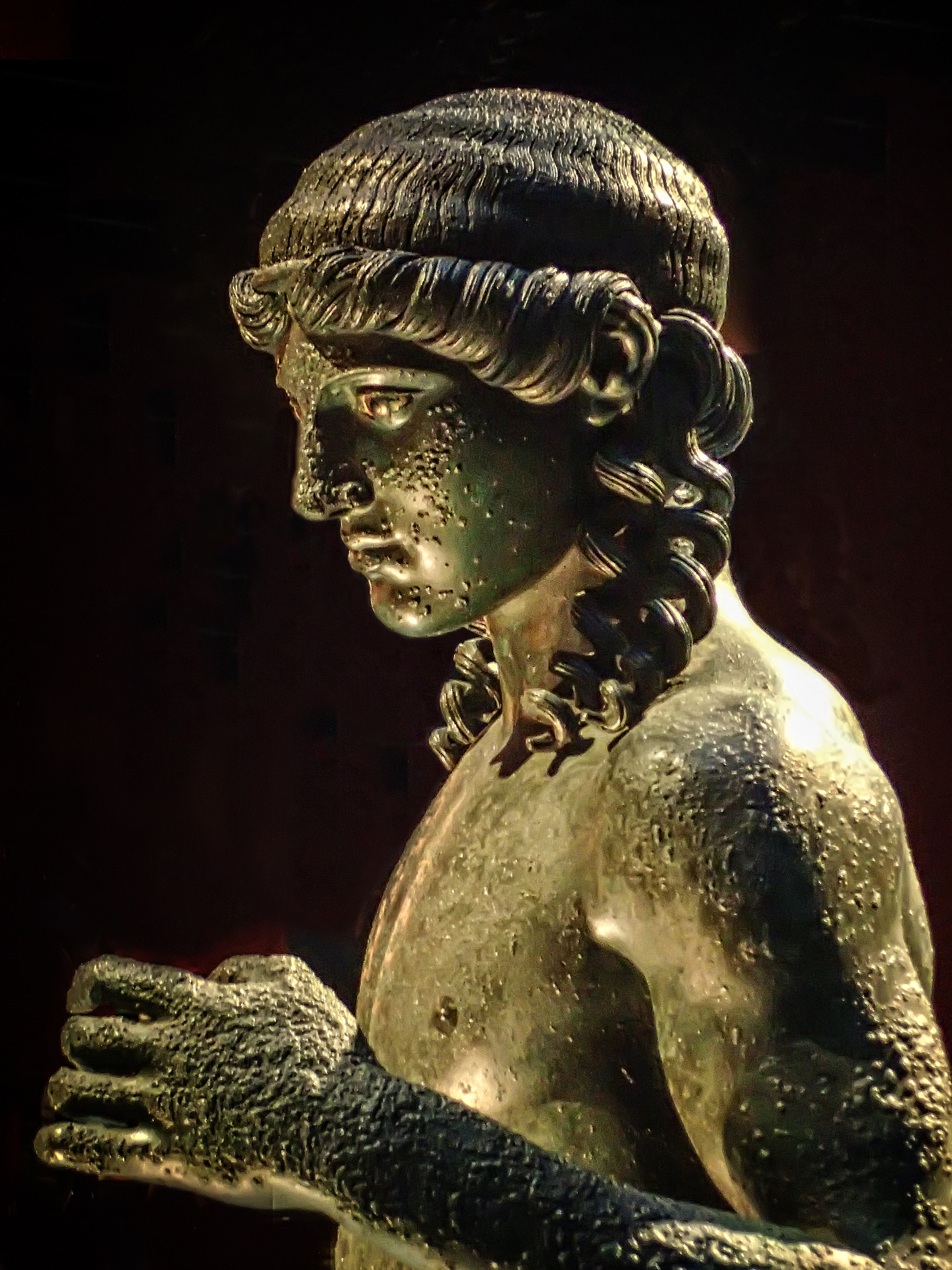
Apollo Citharoedus, first century CE, bronze, found in the Casa del Citarista (I.4.5/25), Naples Archaeological Museum

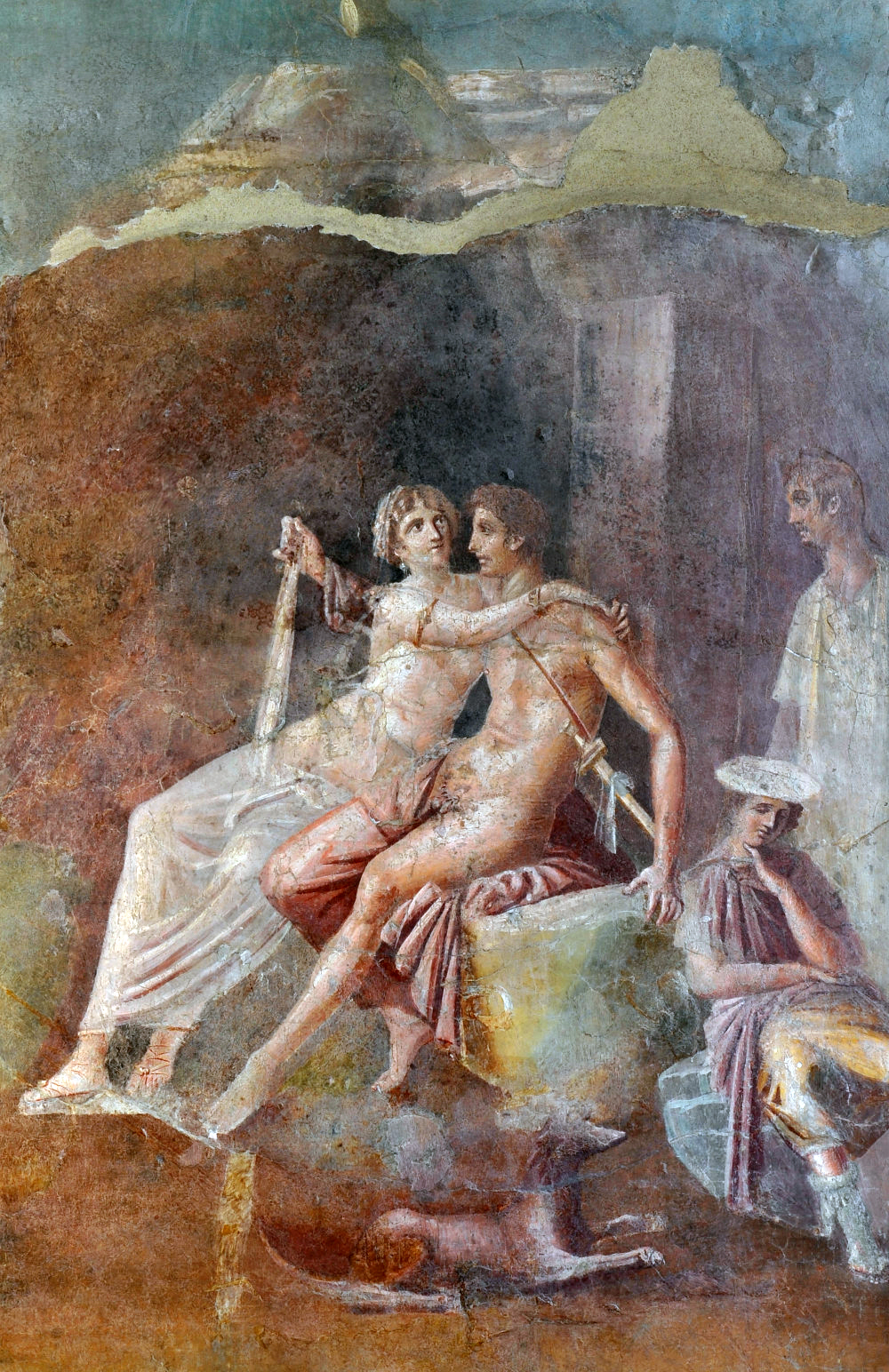
Mars and Venus(Aeneas and Dido?), first century BCE/CE, Casa del Citarista (I.4.5/25), room 20, Naples Archaeological Museum

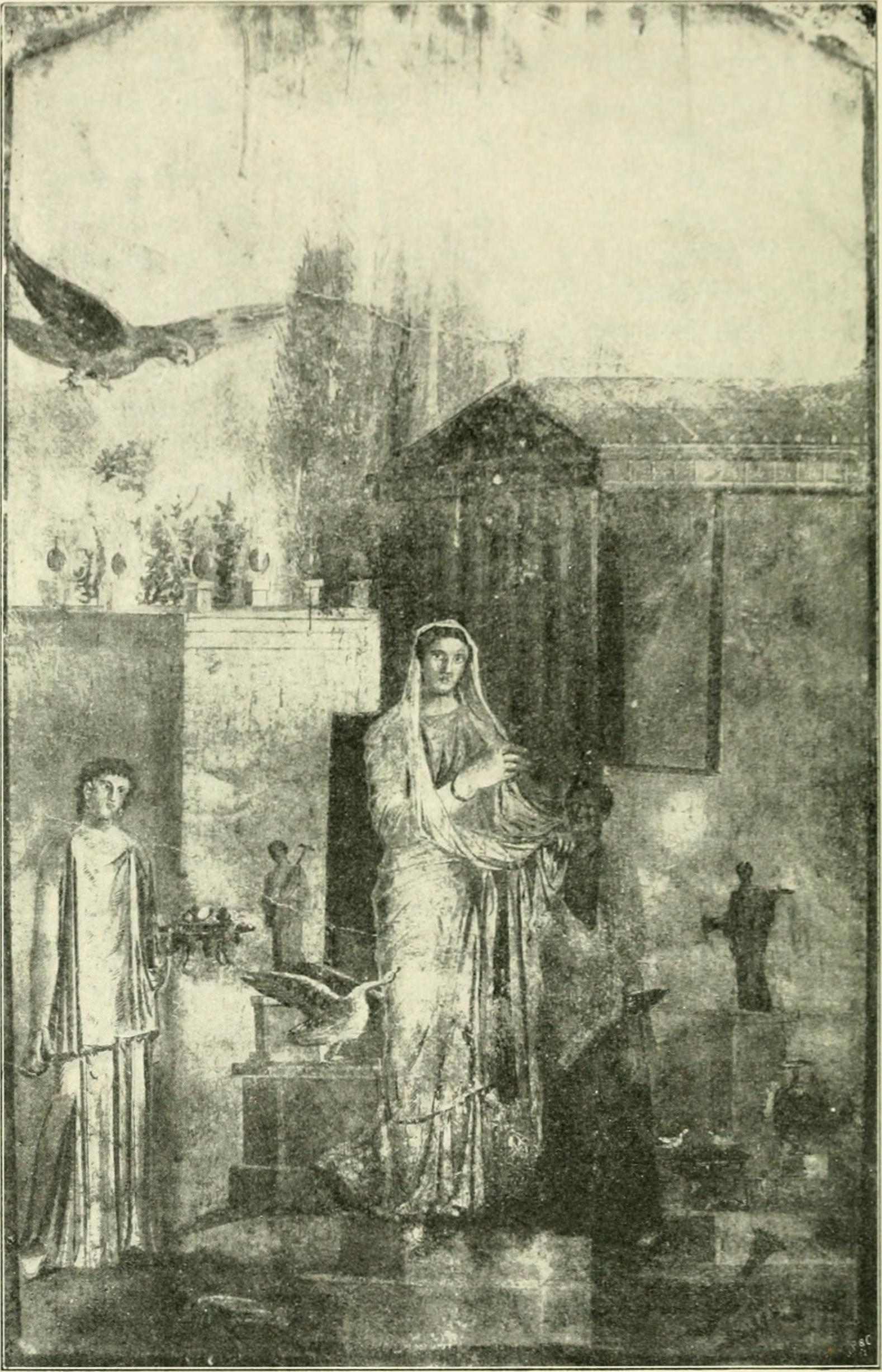
Leda and the swan, first century BCE/CE, Casa del Citarista (I.4.5/25), room 20, Naples Archaeological Museum

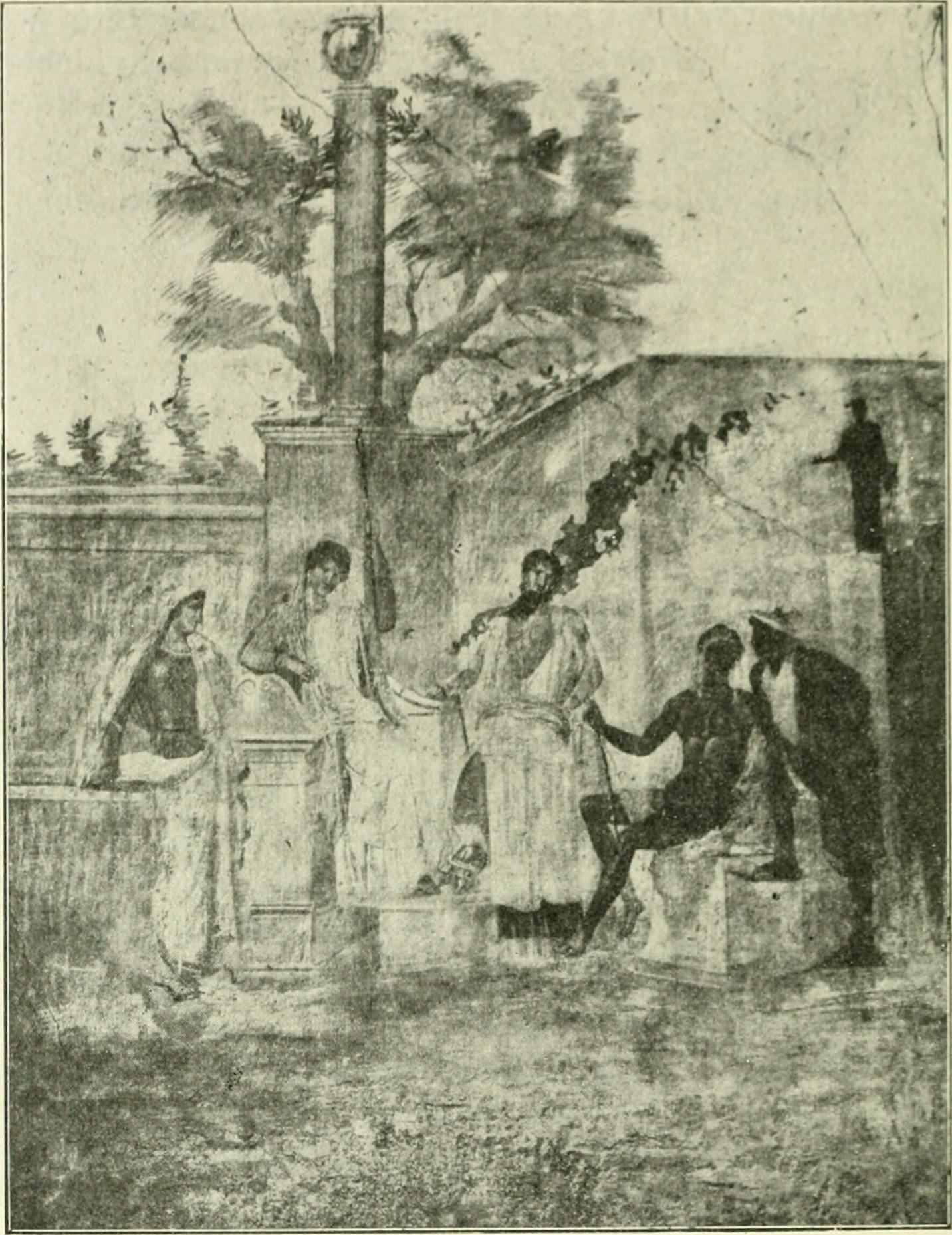
Judgement of Paris, first century BCE/CE, Casa del Citarista (I.4.5/25), room 21, Naples Archaeological Museum

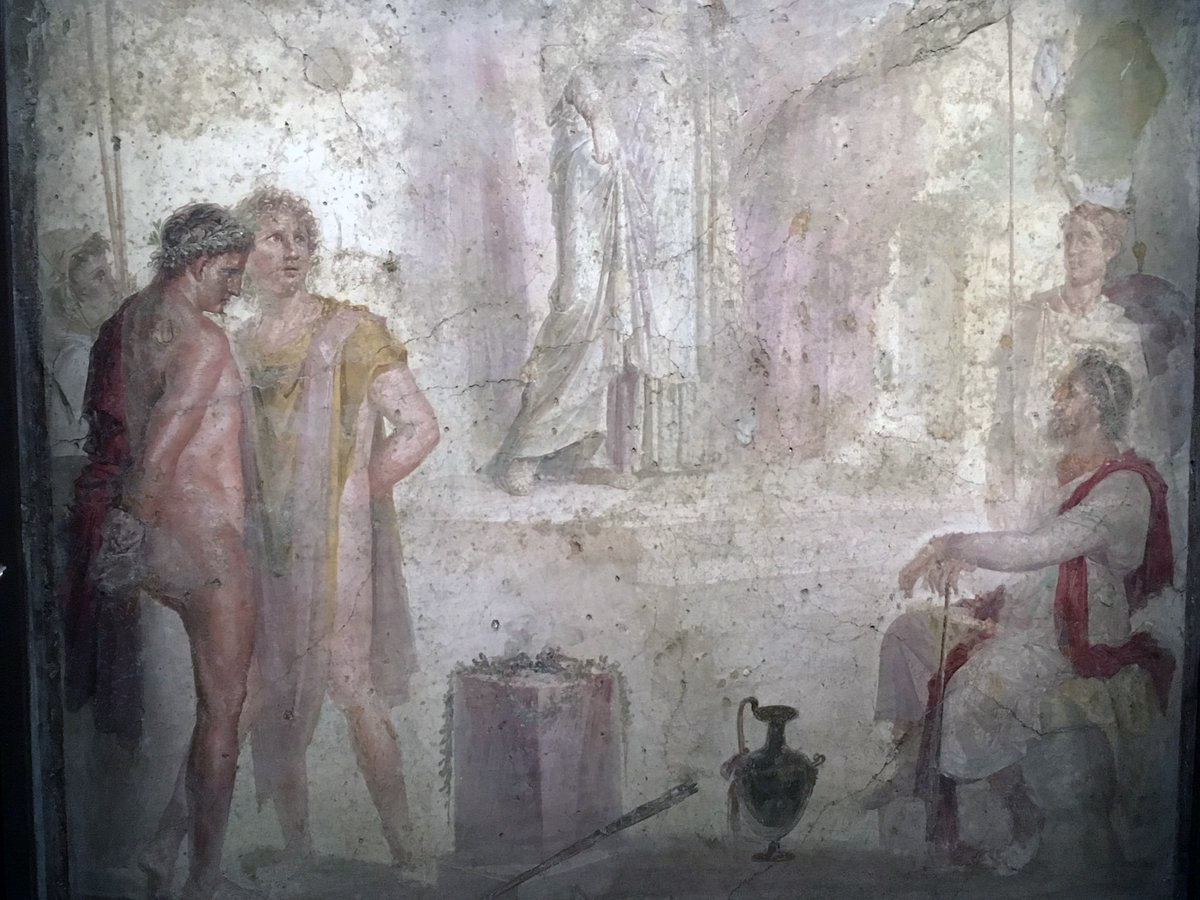
Iphigenia in Tauris (Orestes and Pylades), first century BCE/CE, Casa del Citarista (I.4.5/25), room 35, Naples Archaeological Museum

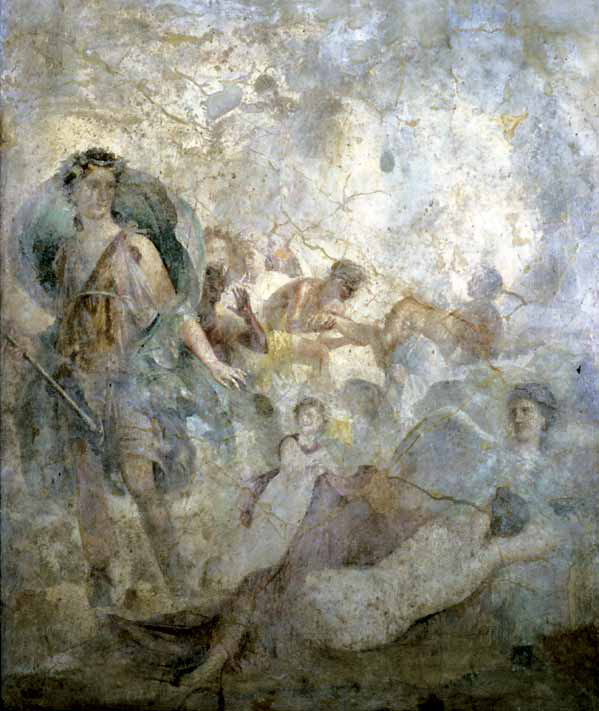
Bacchus and Ariadne, first century BCE/CE, Casa del Citarista (I.4.5/25), Naples Archaeological Museum

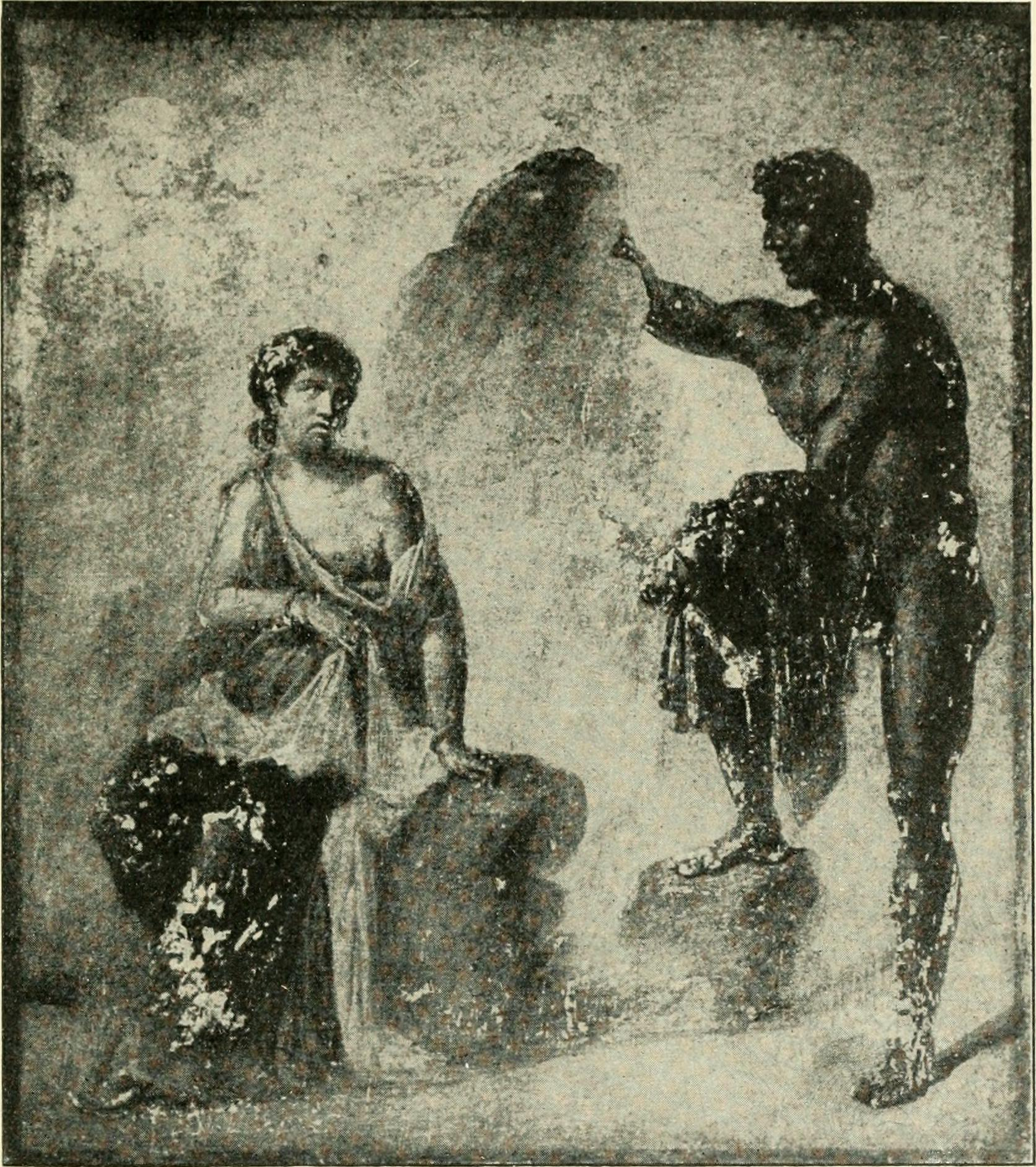
Hermes and Io, first century CE, Casa del Citarista (I.4.5/25), room 37, Naples Archaeological Museum

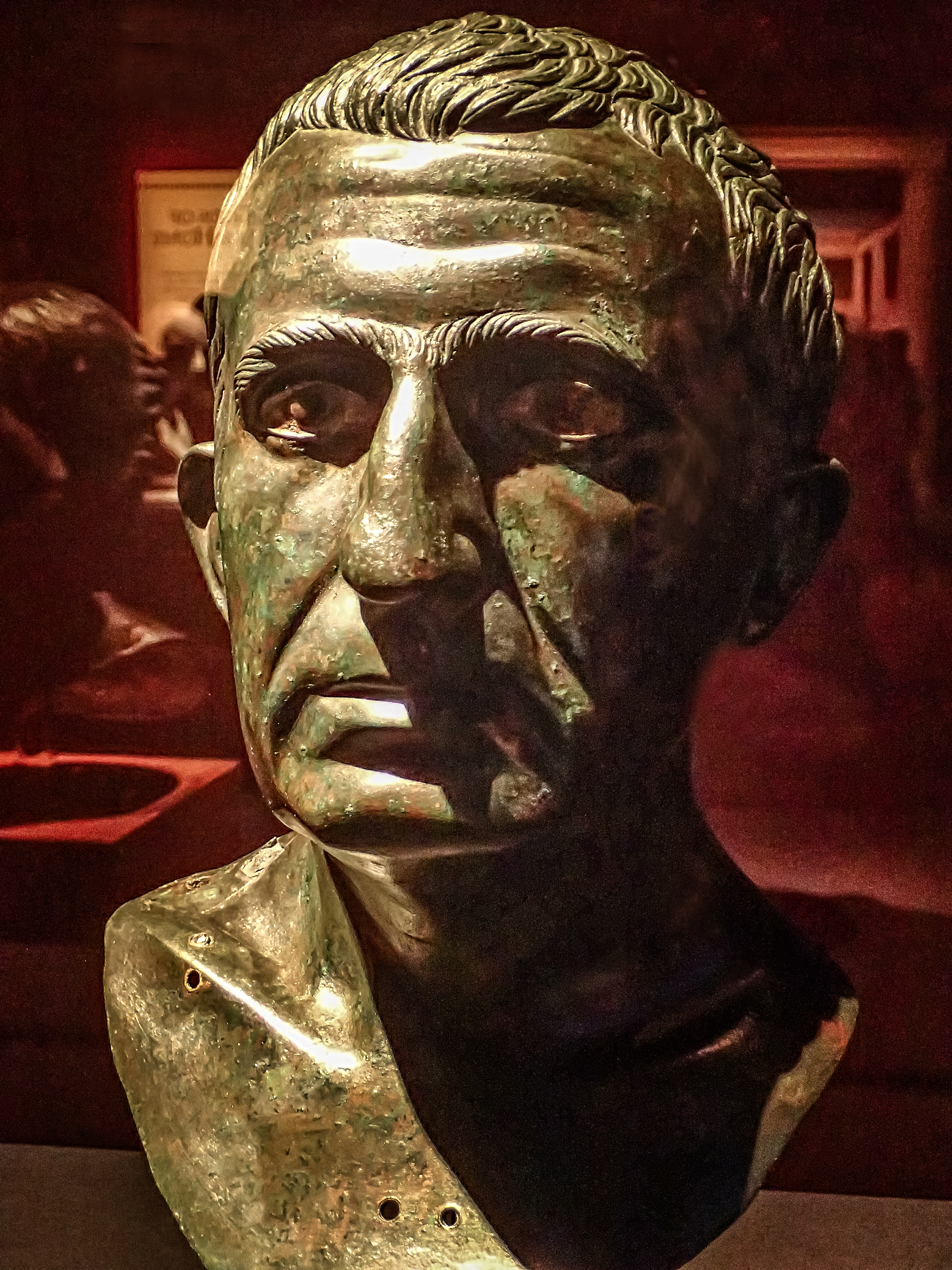
Male bust (member of the Popidii family?), first century CE, bronze, Casa del Citarista (I.2.5/25), Naples Archaeological Museum

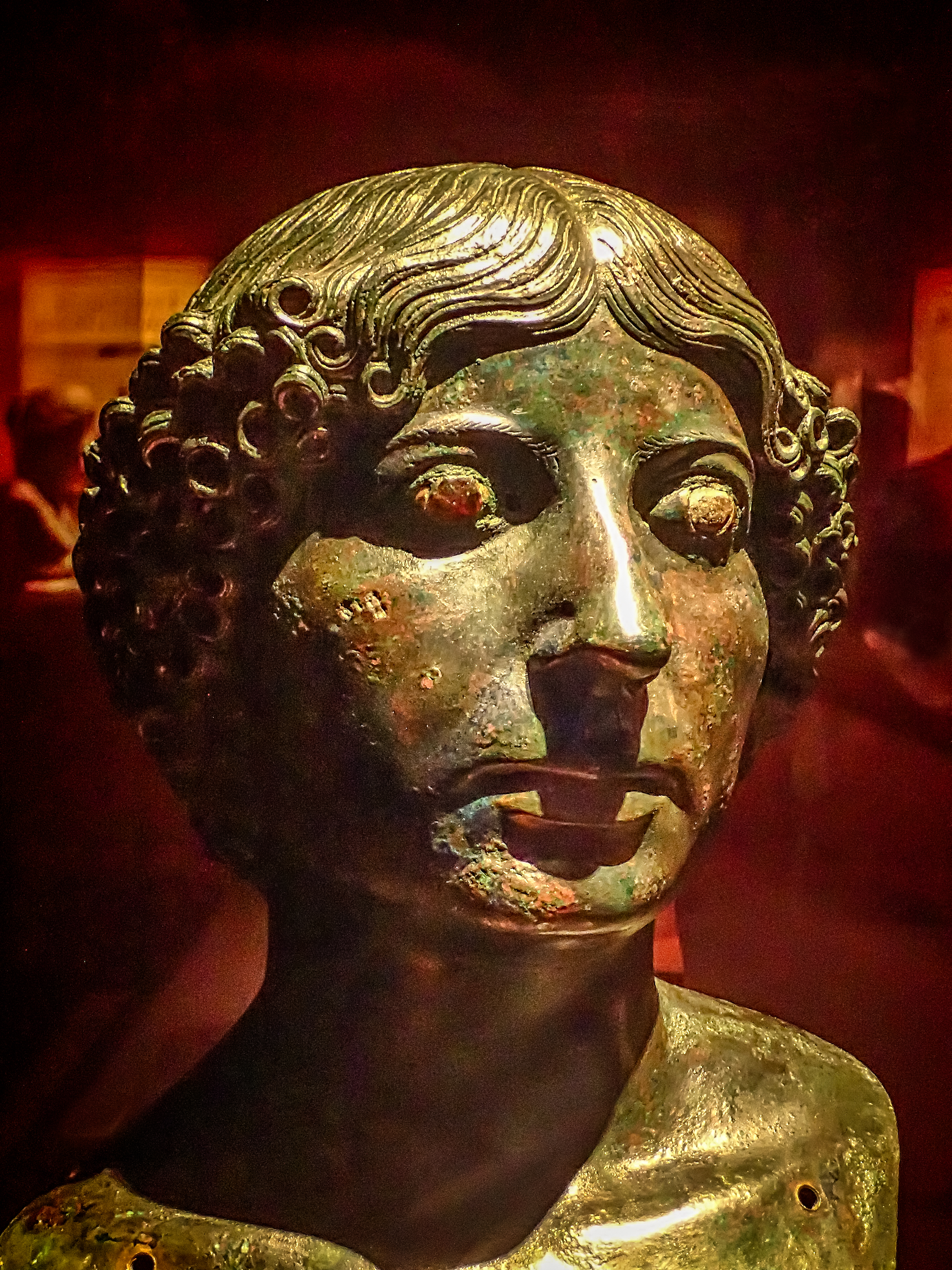
Female bust (member of the Popidii family?), first century CE, bronze, Casa del Citarista (I.4.5/25), Naples Archaeological Museum

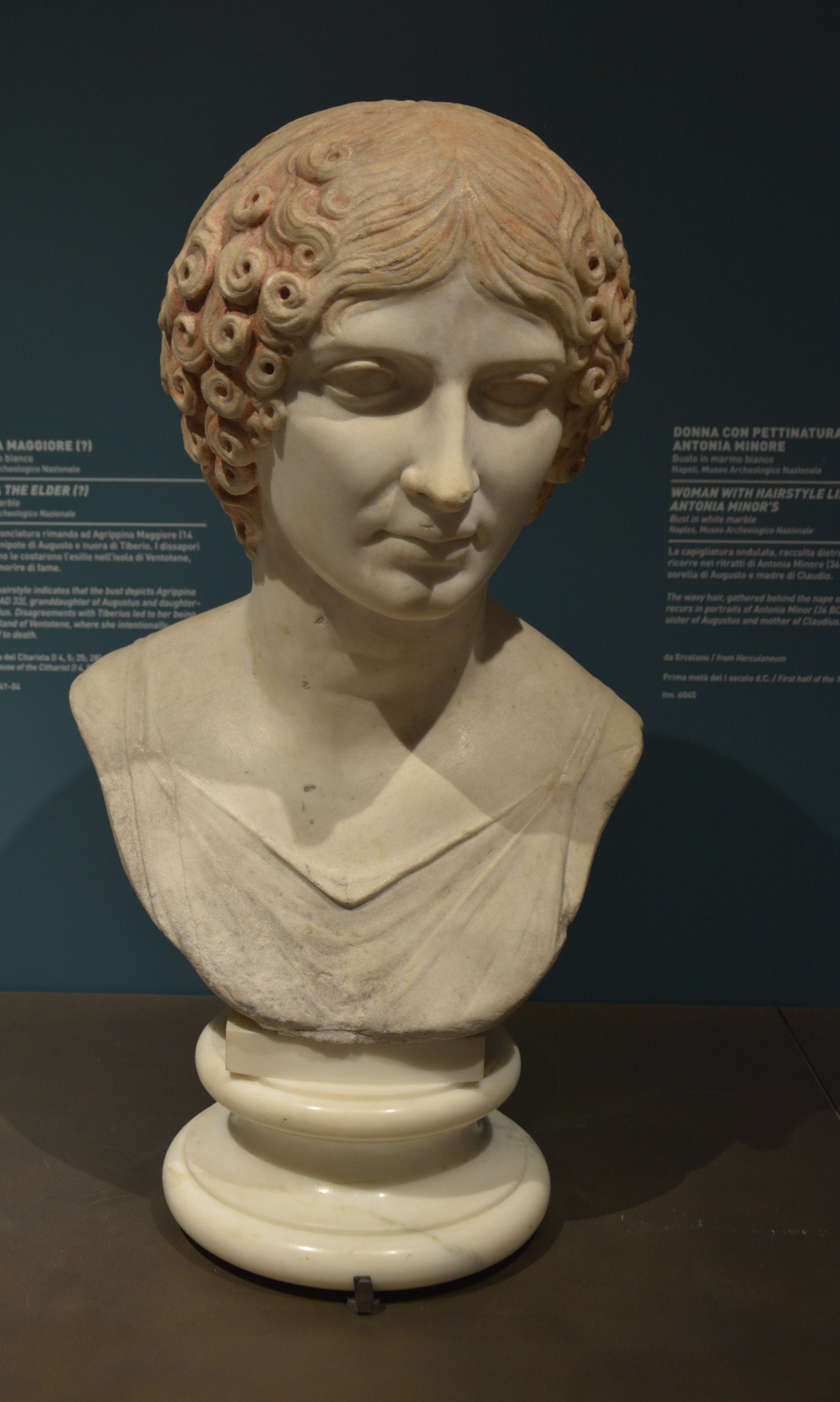
Bust of Agrippina the Elder (?), first century CE, marble, Casa del Citarista (I.4.5/25), room 17, Naples Archaeological Museum
