= Apollo of Mantua =

Type of statue of Apollo

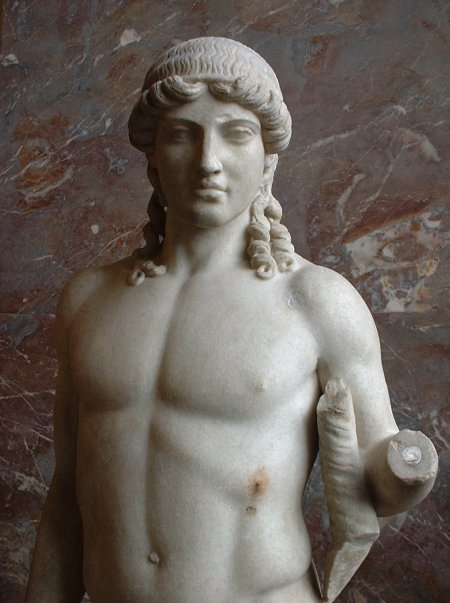
Detail of the Apollon de Mantoue (Louvre Museum)

The Apollo of Mantua and its variants are early forms of the Apollo Citharoedus statue type, in which the god holds the cithara in his left arm. The type-piece, the first example discovered, is named for its location at Mantua; the type is represented by neo-Attic Imperial Roman copies of the late 1st or early 2nd century, modelled upon a supposed Greek bronze original made in the second quarter of the 5th century BCE, in a style similar to works of Polyclitus but more archaic. The Apollo held the cythara against his extended left arm, of which in the Louvre example (illustration) a fragment of one twisting scrolling horn upright remains against his biceps.

More than a dozen other replicas of the type have been found, the principal ones being those conserved in the national museums of Naples and of Mantua.

The lost original would have been bronze. The name of the teacher of Phidias, Hegias of Athens is sometimes invoked, but there are no surviving examples of Hegias' work to judge from.

Examples include:

- The Naples Apollo of Mantua, a bronze found at Pompeii, in the Museo Archeologico Nazionale, Naples (inv. 5630).
- The Louvre Apollo of Mantua, formerly in the Bibliothèque Mazarine, entered the museum in 1871.
