= Apollo Barberini =

Ancient Roman statue

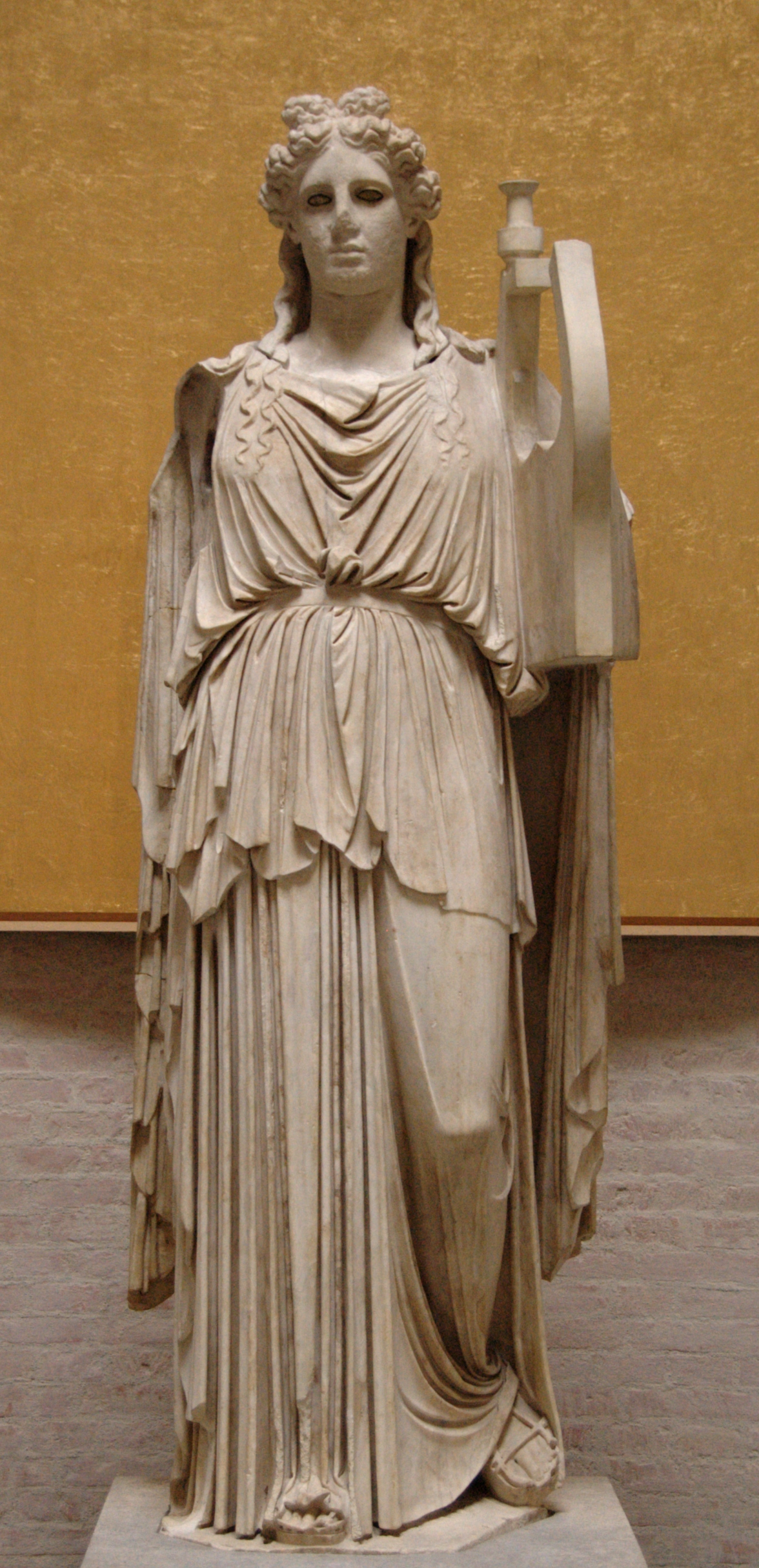
The Apollo Barberini

The Apollo Barberini is a 1st– or 2nd-century Roman sculpture of Apollo Citharoedus. It is named after the Barberini who acquired it. It is now held in the Munich Glyptothek (Inv. 211).

== See also ==
Other items from the Barberini collections:

- Barberini Faun
- Portland Vase

== Sources ==
- Linda Jones Roccos, "Apollo Palatinus: The Augustan Apollo on the Sorrento Base", American Journal of Archaeology, Vol. 93, No. 4 (Oct., 1989), pp. 571-588
