= Apollo Citharoedus =

Images of Apollo with cithara (lyre)

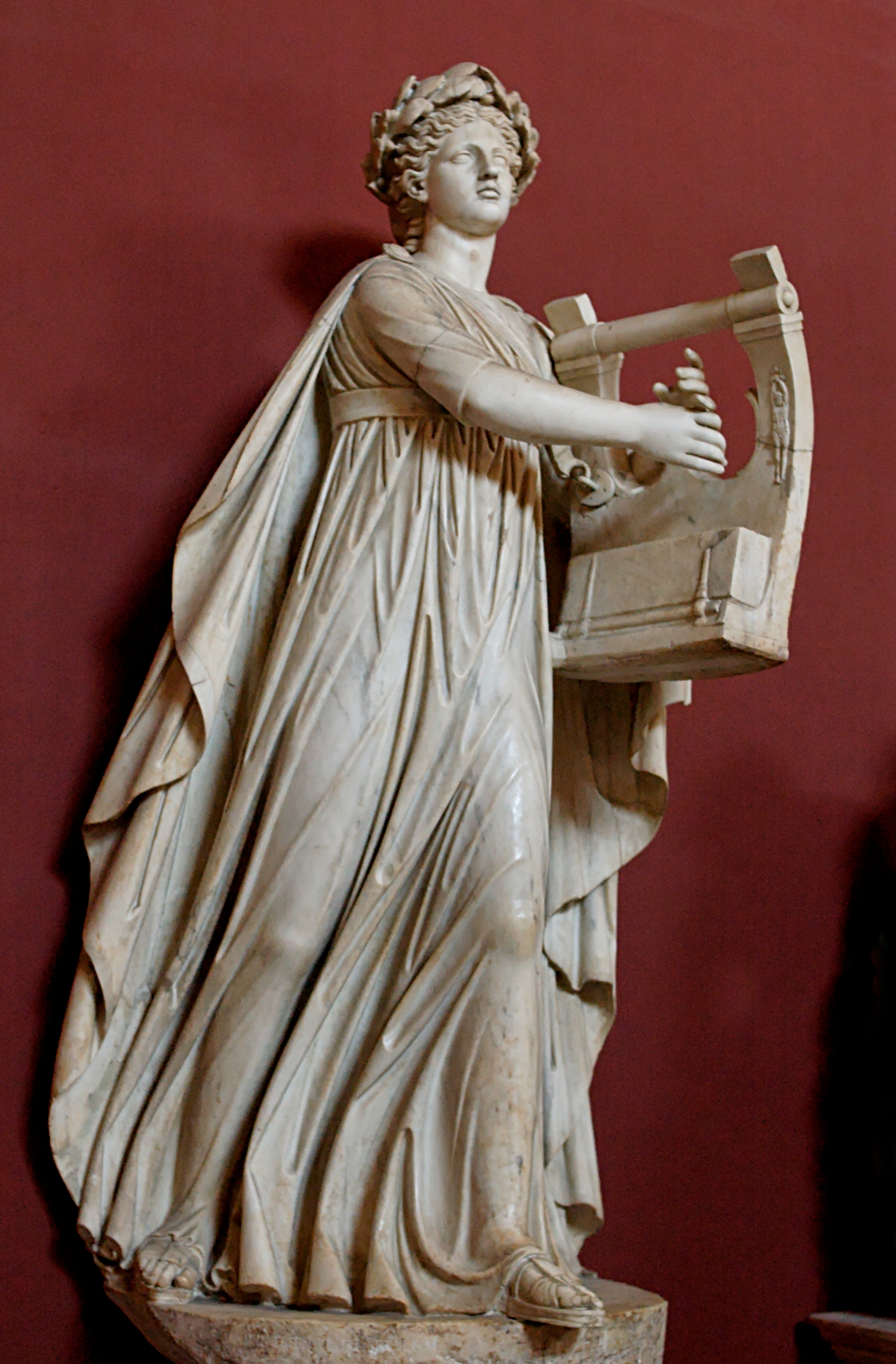
Apollo Citharoedus, showing a cithara with box tail-pieces (Museo Pio-Clementino).

An Apollo Citharoedus, or Apollo Citharede, is a statue or other image of Apollo with a cithara (lyre).

== Notable examples ==
=== Vatican ===
Among the best-known examples is the Apollo Citharoedus, also known as Apollo Musagetes ("Apollo, Leader of the Muses"), of the Vatican Museums, a 2nd-century AD colossal marble statue by an unknown (probably Roman) sculptor. Apollo is shown crowned with laurel and wearing the long, flowing robe of the Ionic bard. The statue was found in 1774 with seven statues of the Muses, in the ruins of Gaius Cassius Longinus' villa near Tivoli, Italy. The sculptures are preserved in the Hall of the Muses, in the Museo Pio-Clementino of the Vatican Museums.

=== Other examples ===
Apollo Citharoedus
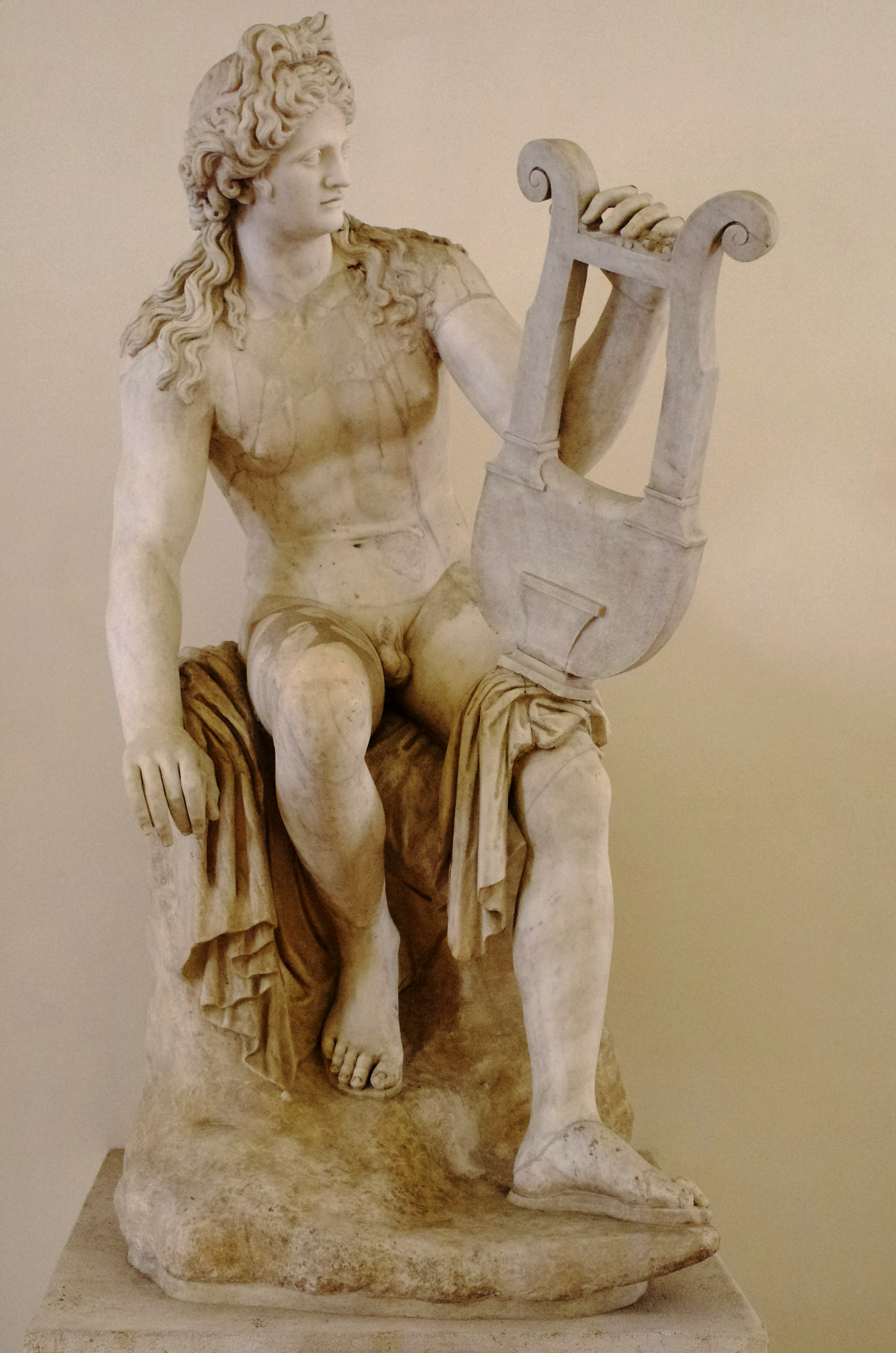
Apollo Altemps, Altemps Palace (Rome)

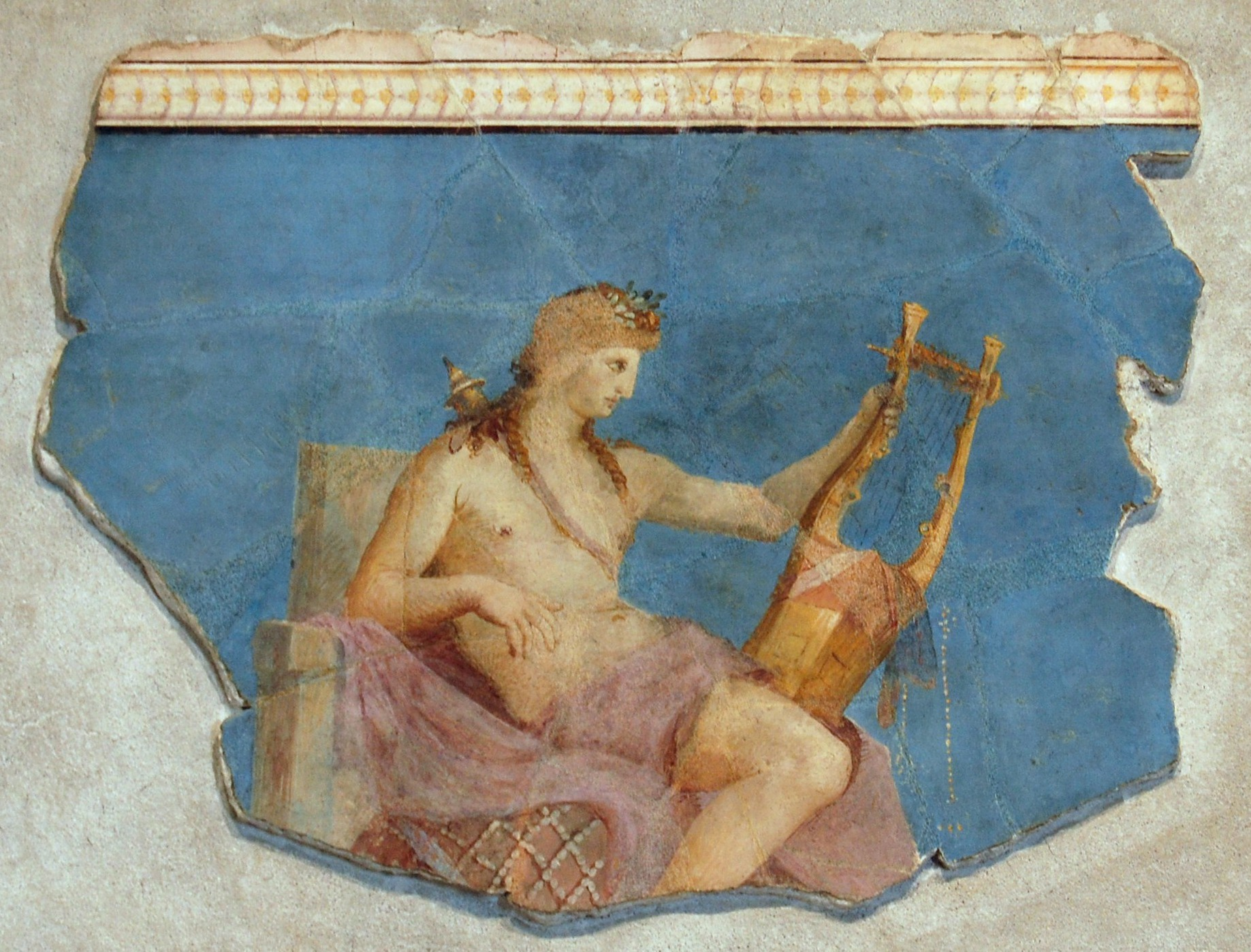
Apollo Citharoedus, a wall-painting from the Palatine Antiquarium

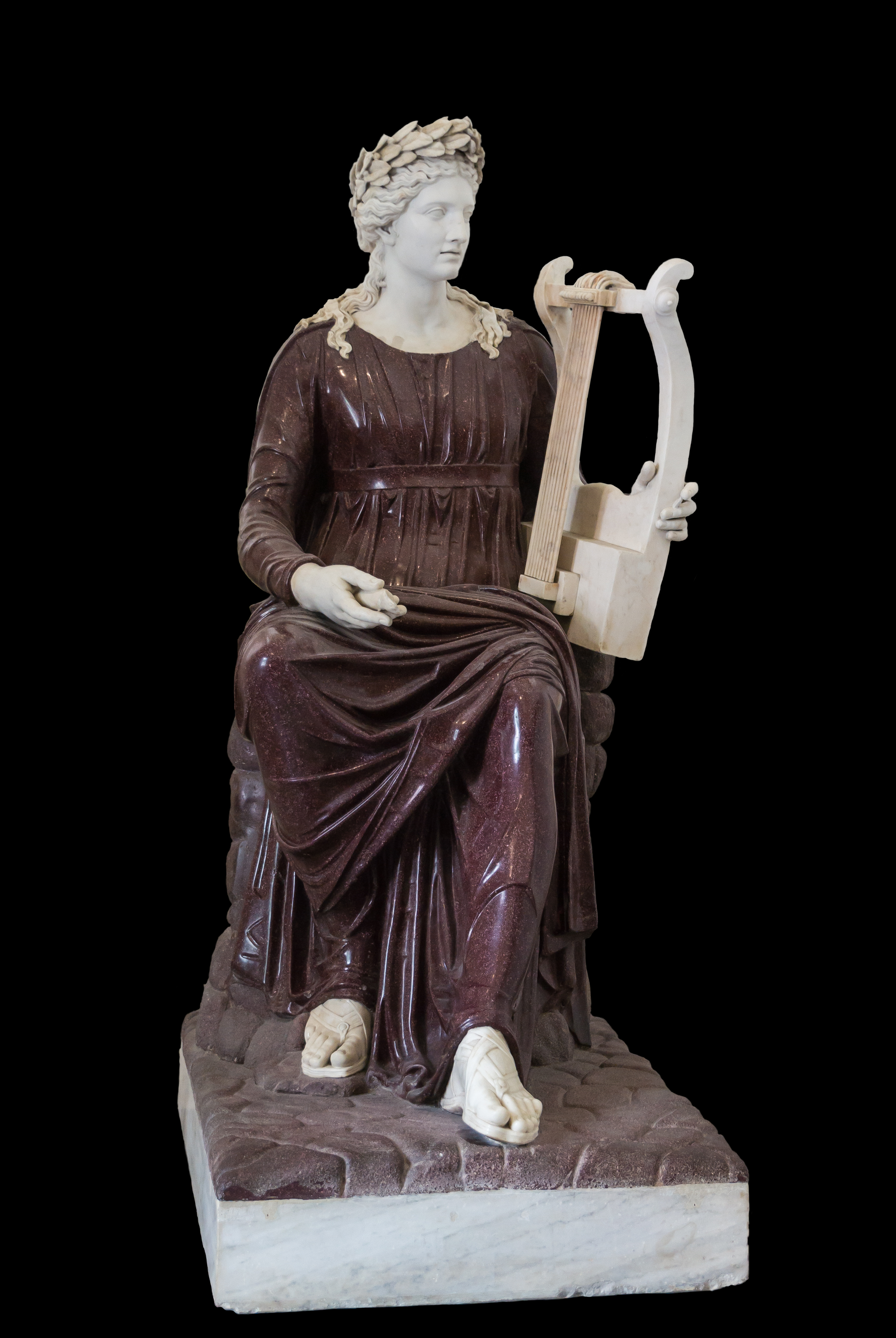
Apollo Citaredo. Porphyry and marble, 2nd century AD. National Archaeological Museum, Naples

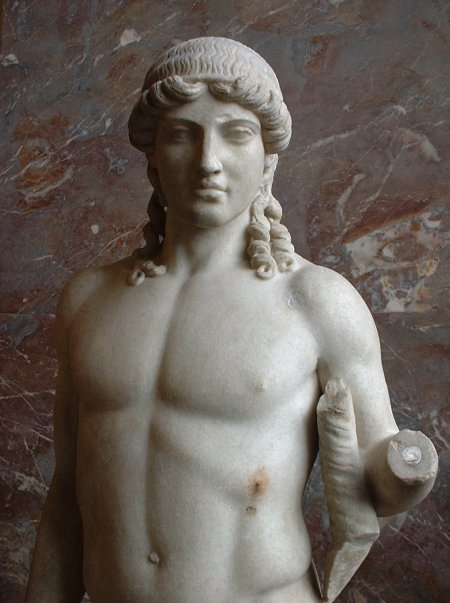
Detail of the Apollon de Mantoue (Louvre)

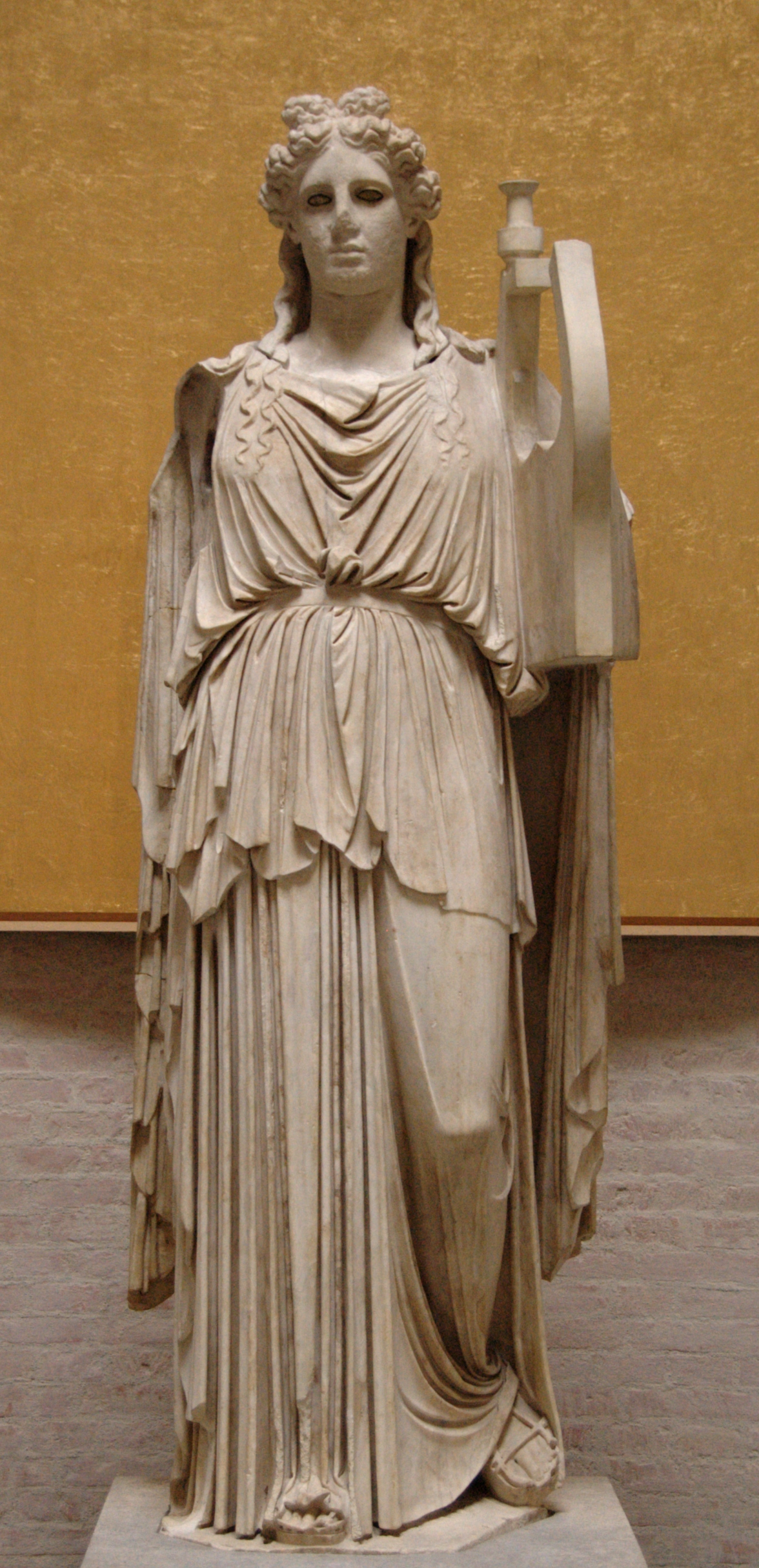
The Apollo Barberini

Apollo column, Academy of Athens

A marble sculpture now identified as Pothos (following a lost Greek 4th-century BC original by Skopas) was restored as an Apollo Citharoedus; it is conserved in the Great Hall of the Palazzo Nuovo, Capitoline Museums, Rome. Another marble Apollo Citharoedus (2.29m), from a Hellenistic original attributed to Timarchides, of the 2nd century BC, also stands in the Great Hall of the Palazzo Nuovo.

Other examples include the Apollo of Mantua and the Apollo Barberini, possibly a copy of the cult statue of the Temple of Apollo Palatinus; it is conserved in the Glyptothek, Munich. The Apollo Citaredo in the National Archaeological Museum, Naples is identified as Apollo but is clearly a female figure. Its provenance is unclear; it has been much restored, the head is unlikely to be original and the figure was probably of Vesta.
