= Epimachus (disambiguation) =

Epimachus is a genus of birds of paradise from New Guinea.

Epimachus or Epimachos may also refer to:

- Epimachus of Athens (c. 300 BC), ancient Greek engineer and architect
- Saint Epimachus of Alexandria (died 250), Roman martyr
- Saint Epimachus of Pelusium, Egyptian martyr
