= Fuficia gens =

Family in ancient Rome

The gens Fuficia was a plebeian family at ancient Rome with the nomen Fuficius. It never achieved great prominence, and is best known for a single individual, Gaius Fuficius Fango or Phango, the Roman governor of Numidia in 40 BC, whom Caesar had previously appointed to the senate. Other Fuficii are known from various inscriptions, indicating that many of them were soldiers, but a Quintus Fuficius Cornutus was consul suffectus in AD 147.

== Origin ==
Little is known about this gens, although it may have been Umbrian, as some early appearances of the name are found in Umbria. The nomen is frequently confused with that of the better-known Fufia gens.

== Praenomina ==
The most common praenomina of the Fuficii appear to have been Marcus and Quintus; but there are also examples of Publius, Gaius, Aulus, Titus, and Sextus.

== Branches and cognomina ==
There is little evidence indicating whether the Fuficii were ever divided into distinct branches. In addition to Fango or Phango, a number of surnames are found in inscriptions, including Certus, Cornutus, Eros, Felix, Fuscus, Januarius, Lybicus, Marcellus, Priscus, Quietus, Rufinus, Tertullinus, and Zethus.

== Members ==
This list includes abbreviated praenomina. For an explanation of this practice, see filiation.

- Fuficia, found in a Spanish inscription.
- Publius Fuficius, an architect.
- Publius Fuficius, a soldier buried at Aquileia.
- Quintus Fuficius, brother of the soldier buried at Aquileia.
- Quintus Fuficius, father of the Quintus mentioned at Puteoli.
- Quintus Fuficius Q. f., found in an inscription at Puteoli.
- Gaius Fuficius, father of the soldier at Burnum.
- Titus Fuficius C. f., a soldier at Burnum.
- Titus Fuficius T. l., a freedman.
- Aulus Fuficius Certhus, found in an inscription at Pompeii.
- Quintus Fuficius Cornutus, consul suffectus in AD 147.
- Marcus Fuficius Eros.
- Gaius Fuficius Fango, governor of Numidia in 40 BC.
- Publius Fuficius Felix, dedicated a monument.
- Marcus Fuficius Fuscus, found in an inscription at Pompeii.
- Fuficia Germana, a freedwoman.
- Fuficius Januarius, found in an inscription at Pompeii.
- Marcus Fuficius Marcellus, father of Marcus.
- Marcus Fuficius M. f. Marcellus.
- Fuficia Marcellina.
- Marcus Fuficius Lybicus, found in a Spanish inscription.
- Fuficia Prima, freedwoman of Titus.
- Fuficia Prisca, freedwoman of Gaia.
- Lucius Fuficius Priscus, found in an Umbrian inscription.
- Marcus Fuficius Quietus, found in a Spanish inscription.
- Marcus Fuficius Rufinus, found in a Spanish inscription.
- Sextus Fuficius Tertullinus.
- Aulus Fuficius Zethus, a freedman.

== See also ==
- List of Roman gentes
