= Umbri =

Italic people of ancient Italy

Ethnolinguistic map of Italy in the Iron Age, before the Roman expansion and conquest of Italy.

The Umbri were an ancient Iron Age Italic people of central Italy who spoke the extinct Umbrian, a language belonging to the Osco-Umbrian branch, an Indo-European subfamily that also includes the Oscan languages. Originally, they inhabited central Italy, extending from the Tiber River, across the Apennines, towards the Adriatic and Tyrrhenian coasts. The Umbrians lived in fortified settlements situated in strategic locations, such as hilltops (oppida), built between the 9th and 4th centuries BC, and worshipped deities such as Iuve Grabovio, Cupra, and Mart at sanctuaries located on high grounds. Their language is known from roughly thirty inscriptions, most notably the Iguvine Tablets (seven bronze tablets discovered in Gubbio from the 3rd to 1st centuries BC) detailing religious rituals. The Umbri wrote using both an Etruscan-derived alphabet and the Latin alphabet.

They first came into contact with Rome around 310 BC, saw their territory gradually subjugated through the 3rd and 2nd centuries BC, and eventually gained full Roman citizenship by 90 BC. Their ancient tribal name was preserved in the name of the Roman admistrative division Regio VI Umbria and the modern region of Umbria.

== Origins ==
=== Ancient sources ===
Herodotus, writing in the 5th-century BCE, provides the earliest literary mention of the Umbrian people, stating that they inhabited the region prior to the supposed migration of the Tyrrhenians from Lydia and into Italy. However, modern scholars agree that Herodotus' account is not based on real events. Moreover, there is no archeological evidence for a migration of the Lydians into Etruria.

Ancient Roman writers thought the Umbri to be of Gaulish origin. Cornelius Bocchus explicitly describes the Umbrians as Gallorum veterum propago - descendants or offspring of the ancient Gauls, and a similar account of their origin has been adopted, either from the same or from different testimony, by Servius, Isidore, and other writers of a late period. Livy suggested that the Insubres, another Gaulish tribe, might be connected; their Celtic name Isombres could possibly mean "Lower Umbrians," or inhabitants of the country below Umbria. Similarly Roman historian Cato the Elder, in his masterpiece Origines, defines the Gauls as "the progenitors of the Umbri". Plutarch wrote that the name might be a different way of writing the name of a northern European tribe, the Ambrones, and that both ethnonyms were cognate with "King of the Boii". Plutarch explains that the Ligurians also claimed the name Ambrones as an ancestral designation.

Pliny the Elder wrote concerning the folk-etymology of the name:

The Umbrian people are thought the oldest in Italy; they are believed to have been called Ombrii (here, "the people of the thunderstorm," after ὅμβρος, "thunderstorm") by the Greeks because they survived the deluge (literally "the inundation of the lands by thunderstorms, imbribus). The Etruscans vanquished 300 Umbrian cities.

== Geographical area ==
Ancient Greek and Roman authors believed that the Umbri once inhabited a vast territory across central and northern Italy, extending from the Apennine Mountains toward Ravenna, Mantua, Ancona, Ariminium, and the Tyrrhenian coast north of the Fiora River. Pliny the Elder lists them among the inhabitants of Campania, alongside the Etruscans, Greeks, Campanians, and Osci. Subsequent Etruscan expansion and the migrations of Gallic peoples progressively reduced the territory of the Umbri to the Apennine valleys and areas bordering Sabina.

According to ancient literary traditions, the Sabellian peoples, including the Sabines and Samnites, as well as related communities such as the Marsi, Marrucini, Paeligni, Picentes, Hirpini, and others, shared a common ancestral Umbrian origin. Their southward migration through the process of Ver sacrum, the ritualized extension of colonies, in southern Latium, Molise and the whole southern half of the peninsula, replaced the previous tribes, such as the Opici, the Ausones and the Oenotrians.

== Archaeological sites ==
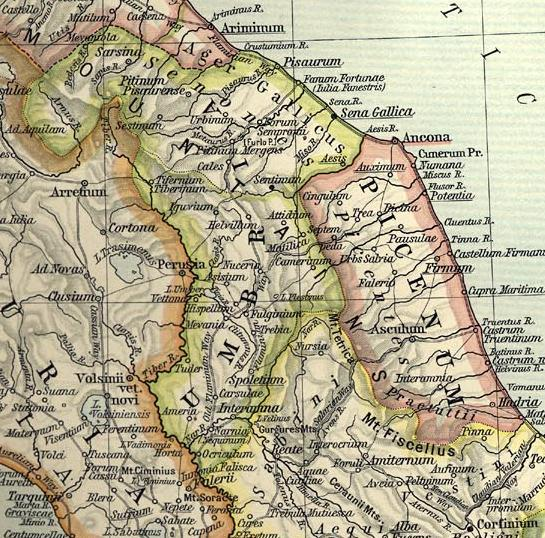
Map of part of central Italy at the time of Augustus, showing the two regions Regio VI Umbria (with the Ager Gallicus ), and Regio V Picenum

The Umbrians are associated with the culture of Terni, protohistoric facies of southern Umbria, dated between the Late Bronze Age and the Early Iron Age (10th century BC - 7th century BC). Although archaeological evidence is still limited and scattered, it remains difficult to completely understand how the Umbrian tribes developed their economy, culture, and social identity. This is especially true when compared to the more advanced Tyrrhenian and Adriatic regions. The lack of solid information is particularly clear for the earliest period, covering the late Bronze Age and early Iron Age (1300 to 1000 BC). With the start of the Iron Age, the historical settlements of the Umbrians were continuously occupied almost without interruption through to the Roman period and beyond. These settlements include the modern towns of Terni, Colfiorito, Spoleto, Todi, Gubbio, Spello, Amelia, Matelica, and Pitino.

The area near Terni, called Interamna Nahars in ancient times, is very important for learning about ancient Umbria. Archaeologists found many signs of large settlements with early town features from the beginning of the Iron Age. Close by, Maratta Bassa has remains of buildings from the 6th century BC with roofs made of flat and curved tiles. A Latin inscription says the city was founded in 672 BC.

The most interesting finds come from two cemeteries at Acciaierie and S. Pietro in Campo, where about 2,000 tombs were discovered from the 10th to 4th centuries BC. At first, people cremated their dead, but by the 8th century BC they began burying them in graves. Many tombs belonged to warrior leaders and had rich gifts similar to those from southern Etruria. The graves were marked with stone circles or mounds, a tradition common in central Italy.

Assisi, called Asisium by the Romans, was an ancient Umbrian site on a spur of Mount Subasio. Myth relates that the city was founded by Dardanus in 847 BC. Perugia and Orvieto were instead of Etruscan origin. According to the geographical distribution of the Umbrian territory, they are located on the left side of the Tiber River, which is part of the ancient Etruria. Umbri were on the opposite side of the river.

== Language ==
The Umbrians spoke an Italic language related to Latin, although the Umbrian language was more specifically a member of the Osco-Umbrian branch of Italic rather than the Latino-Faliscan branch to which Latin belongs. There are about thirty inscriptions written in the Umbrian language. They include public writings, religious messages, boundary marks, ownership signs, funeral writings, artist names, and coin writings. The most important are the Iguvine Tablets—seven bronze plates written in Umbrian using two alphabets: the Etruscan alphabet and the Latin alphabet. They were found in Gubbio near an old Roman theater in the 1400s.

== Religion ==
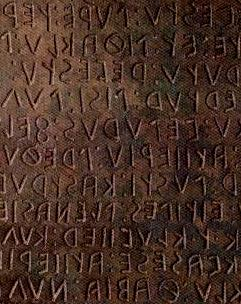
Detail of an Iguvine Tablet with inscription in Umbrian language

=== Iguvine Tablets ===
The Iguvine Tablets were discovered in 1444 at Scheggia, near Gubbio, Italy. Composed during the 2nd or 3rd centuries BC, they describe religious rituals involving animal sacrifice. The modern Festival of Ceri, celebrated every year in Gubbio on May 15 in honor of Bishop Ubald or Ubaldo of Gubbio (1084–1160), shares certain features with the rites described in aforementioned Iguvine tables mentioned above, and so may be a survival of that ancient pre-Christian custom. It is also celebrated in Jessup, PA, a town with a large number of immigrants from the Gubbio area, as Saint Ubaldo Day.

=== Deities ===
Numerous deities are described in the Iguvine Tablets, many likely as subordinates to other more important gods such as Jupiter or Mars. These potentially lesser divinities are often mentioned with epithets, usually the names of other gods. For instance, the divine entity Turse ("the one-who-terrifies") is variously recorded as "Tuse Çerfie" ("Torsa Cerfia") and "Tuse Iovia" ("Torsa Jovia"). Likewise, the goddess Prestate ("the one-who-protects") is recorded in the Iguvine Tablets as "Prestate Çerfie," implying an association with the god Çerfe. These Umbrian deities may have served as deified representations of general ideas associated with other gods. If this theory is accepted, then the goddess Prestate would have personified the concept of protection and would have been invoked when another good was propriated for their protective capabilities. De Cazanove compares these Umbrian onomastic formulae to the "books of the priests" ("libris sacerdotum") mentioned by Aulus Gellius that supposedly include phrases such as "Salacia of Neptune" ("Salaciam Neptuni") or "Maia of Vulcan" ("Maiam Volcani").

The linguist Francesco Burroni suggests that Umbrian Çerfie may derive from earlier *KerVzio-, itself possibly from Proto-Indo-European *ḱerh₁/₃(e)sii̯o-, which perhaps derives from *ḱerh₁/₃ēs, whence also possibly the Roman god Ceres. Likewise, the philologist Michiel de Vaan suggests that Umbrian Çerfe derives from Proto-Italic *keres-o-, which he considers to be a "male counterpart to Ceres." According to de Vaan, the term Çerfie—an adjectival form of the theonym—probably derives from an earlier form *keresjo-. However, the historian Barbette Spaeth doubts the accuracy of this comparison, noting that—unlike Ceres—the Umbrian divinity is largely associated with war. Another possibility, suggested on the basis of Paelignian cerfum, maintains that the Umbrian term derives from Proto-Indo-European *ḱerdʰo-, whence also perhaps Sanskrit śárdha ("troop," "horde").

The Iguvine Tablets describe a sacrifice to the gods Jupiter, Mars, and an obscure deity named Vufiune. Etymologically, the name of this deity has been connected to the Proto-Indo-European root *h₁lewdʰ- ("to grow"). Alternatively, his name may be related to Latin voveō ("to vow") and derive from the Proto-Indo-European root *h₁wegʷʰ- ("to promise, vow"), perhaps indicating that the domain of the deity pertained to vows. Vufiune may correspond to the Roman deity Quirinus, a member of the hypothetical Roman Archaic Triad, which may indicate that the Umbrian religion possessed a similar tripartite conceptualization of its chief divinities. Various other Umbrian deities are grouped into triads. For instance, the goddesses Prestota S̀erfia and Tursa S̀erfia are connected with the god S̀erfus Martius.

Both the Umbrian and Roman triads may reflect Proto-Indo-European trifunctionality, a hypothesis advanced by the philologist Georges Dumézil which argues that Proto-Indo-European religion conceptualized a set of three divinities each associated with military, priestly, and social functions. Within Umbrian and Roman religion, the martial and priestly roles were fulfilled by Mars and Jupiter respectively, although Vufiune may have fulfilled the societal role in Umbrian religion. However, the archaeologist Olivier de Cazanove argues that the similarities between Roman and Umbrian tripartism may only exist at the surface level, as the three deities are mentioned within the context of a particular ritual function that itself may be unrelated to any known Roman ceremony. Moreover, even if the Umbrian triad reflects a Proto-Indo-European tradition, the extent to which it was directly inherited from the Proto-Indo-European religion or borrowed from neighboring cultures is unclear.

==== List of deities ====
Name	Details
Açetus	Uncertain etymology and function, though it has been connected with either Latin agō ("to do") or aiō ("to speak, say"). If the former theory is accepted, then the term may represent both Ahtus Jupiter and Ahtus Mars as a group. Alternatively, Poultney prefers to connect the term with the diis Ancitibus.
Ahtu	Mentioned in two lines from the Iguvine tablets describing an animal sacrifice. Within the ritual, a sheep is sacrificed to an entity named Ahtus Jupiter and a boar is sacrificed to another being referred to as Ahtus Mars. Etymologically, the name has been connected with either Latin agō ("to do") or aiō ("to speak, say"). Regarding their function, Poultney suggests that the term Ahtu was associated with "oracular utterance."
Çerfe	Possibly a male equivalent of Ceres.
Cupra	Ancient Italic goddess worshipped throughout both Picenum and Umbria.
Fiiuvi	God to whom several ceremonies are dedicated in the Iguvine tablets. It is not clear whether they are the same deity as the Fiso also known from Iguvium. Etymologically, their name has been connected to Proto-Indo-European *bʰeydʰ- ("to trust").
Fise	It is not clear whether they are the same deity as the Fiso also known from Iguvium. Etymologically, their name has been connected to Proto-Indo-European *bʰeydʰ- ("to trust").
Hoier	Little is known about this term and it cannot be conclusively determined that it refers to a deity. This term is perhaps a misspelling of Hule with an -i- having been accidentally transcribed instead of an -l- via the omission of a crossbar. Alternatively, the name has been equated with huřie, though Poultney considers the loss of -rs- difficult to explain within this theory.
Hule	Essentially nothing is known about this deity; they exclusively appear in one single line from the Iguvine tablets. Their gender cannot be determined with certainty through strictly linguistic means, though most scholars interpret the divinity as female. The Iguvine tablets describe a ceremony wherein a suppliant provides an offering to the god whilst kneeling. According to Poultney, given that the items were offered from below, it is possible that this deity had some chthonic characteristics. Poultney further suggests a possible relationship with the Roman god Helernus.
Hunte	According to de Vaan, etymologically, the name probably connects to humus ("ground, soil") and meant something akin to "one from below." It is likely that the role of this deity pertained to the underworld.
Iuve	Umbrian equivalent of Jupiter.
Marte	Umbrian equivalent of Mars.
Padellar	The name of this deity is usually etymologically connected to Panda, a Roman goddess. The Iguvine tablets reference a "gate of Padella" which may parallel the "porta Pandana" ("gate of Panda") mentioned by Varro and Festus, two Roman authors.
Piquier Martier	The name is Latinizable as Picus Martius, in which case it is connected with the Latin word picus ("woodpecker") and the god Mars.
Puemune	Little is known of this deity, though they were probably the divine consort of Vesune. Poultney etymologically links his name to that of the Roman goddess Pomona. De Vaan, however, prefers a connection with Latin eō ("to go"), suggesting that, based on its etymology, the name of this deity means something akin to "the goer" or "who has a going," which perhaps evolved to mean "of the year." Regarding the role of this god, it has been suggested they were associated with a type of New Year festival in Umbrian religion. That the deity was connected to the yearly cycle is perhaps reinforced by their epithet Pupřikes, which has been connected to *kʷékʷlos ("wheel, circle"), though this same term has alternatively been connected with publicus ("public").
Prestate	This goddess was probably viewed as in some way a protector of the Iguvine community.
Purtupite	According to Poultney, their name is most likely a corruption of *Purtuvite, itself connected to the verb purtuvitu ("to offer, present").
Speture	God mentioned only once in the Iguvine tablets. Etymologically, this name connects to Latin speciō ("to observe"), the root of which also appears in augural terms such as auspicium ("divination, augury"). Within Umbrian itself, the related term speturie is glossed by Poultney as an adjective signifying "augury." Poultney thus concludes that Speture was in some way associated with augury.
Stafli	The name of this god is etymologically connected to stabilis ("established," "stands firm").
Supunne	The name of Supunne has been etymologically connected to Latin supō ("to throw"), perhaps indicating that the goddess pertained to the tossing of food into a pot as part of a ritual burning.
Tefre	The name of this god is probably connected to the Umbrian word tefra, which has been glossed "burnt offerings." According to Poultney, if the interpretation of this term is correct, then the god perhaps was associated with the hearth.
Tikamne	Poultney and De Vaan both interpret this term as the name of a deity, which Poultney latinizes as Dicamnus. Buck, however, alternatively glosses the term as merely a noun with the meaning "dedication." The word is perhaps etymologically connectable to Latin dīcō ("to say, speak"). The Etruscan deity Tekum may have been borrowed from this Umbrian god.
Trebe	Probably from the same root as the verb trebeit ("to live, dwell"), in which case the god was probably associated with a house.
Turse	Etymologically, the name of this goddess means "terror." Her divine role was probably to terrify and ward off the enemies of the Iguvine community.
Vestiçe	The name of the god has been connected with that of the Roman goddess Vesta, which—if accepted—would imply that they were associated with the hearth.
Vesune	Probably the divine consort of Puemune. Poultney connected the name of the deity to Gaulish Vesunna or Latin Vesuvius. However, de Vaan prefers to relate the term to Marsian uesune and derives the name from *wetsós ("of a year"). De Vaan suggests that, etymologically, the name Vesune means something akin to "lady of the year," though—given the comparison with Vedic Sanskrit ("vatsá," "yearling calf")—the name may have alternatively meant "lady of the calves." If the former theory is accurate, then the divine function of the deity perhaps related to the yearly cycle and her suppliants perhaps sought from her information concerning their fates. However, the classicist L. Bouke van der Meer argues that the proposed connection between the goddess and a yearly festival is premised partially upon the right-to-left reading of an inscription that is actually, according to van der Meer, actually written left-to-right.
Vufiune	The name of this deity is variously connected with either the Proto-Indo-European root *h₁wegʷʰ- ("to promise, vow") or *h₁lewdʰ- ("to grow; people"). If the former theory is accepted, the deity was perhaps associated with vows. Alternatively, if the latter theory is accepted, then the god perhaps pertained to vegetation and growth. In this case, then the god provides a better functional parallel for Quirinus and thus stronger evidence for the existence of Indo-European trifunctionality.

=== Sanctuaries ===
Umbrian sanctuaries were usually established on mountains, often the highest mountain peak within the surrounding area. Though, other sanctuary sites are known to have existed near lakes, caves, hills, hillforts, or settlements. Evidence of thousands of animal bone fragments from Monte Ansciano attests to consumption and feasting rituals, which—given the highly visible nature of Umbrian mountaintop sanctuaries, many of which were situated in such a manner that they were viewable from the other sites—perhaps publicly emphasized the existence of Umbrian group to the others. Various Umbrian sanctuaries appear to be located in areas that were previously home to other structures, usually during the Bronze Age around the 12th-11th centuries BCE. It is likely that the reoccupation of such spaces was premised on either distant memories of their former significance or because their age had conferred a sense of importance onto them. Numerous hilltop sanctuaries in Gubbio were situated in such a manner that they were often visible from each other, perhaps reflecting a sense of shared communal identity.

Umbrian sanctuaries generally varied significantly in construction technique, with each individual cult site likely designed—not according to any standardized model—but instead to best satisfy the needs of the local populace. Unlike the Latins and the Etruscans, who—during the 6th-century BCE—developed unique architectural styles that became characteristic of their religious sites, the Umbrians primarily utilized open-air spaces largely devoid of any manmade structures as their sacred spaces. Nevertheless, there are still scant traces of architectural constructions at various Umbrian ritual areas. In certain sacred spaces, manmade structures may have been used to define the territorial boundaries of the site. For instance, the sanctuary of Monte Ansciano demarcated its sacred space utilizing a limestone platform constructed atop an older wall dated to the Bronze Age. Similarly, the sanctuaries of Monte Acuto and Colle Mori outlined their territories utilizing drystone walls composed of limestone that surrounded a rectangular sacred space, which—in Monte Acuto— was likely involved in sacrificial rituals.

Nearby the rectangular space of Monte Acuto lay a pit that contained—among various other artifacts—votive objects and fragments of bovine skeletons, which likely belonged to the sacrificed animals. Likewise, the sanctuary of Colle Mori contained a pit at the center of its rectangular space that also contained votive objects, although it also likely functioned as a cistern. In Monte Moro, it is likely that the pit was also once a cistern that served to store food, gather rainwater, and house votive objects. However, the pit at Monte Torre Maggiore may have functioned as the foundation of the sanctuary space, as it was uncovered filled with sand underneath the pronaos of a later 3rd-century CE temple.

=== Votives ===
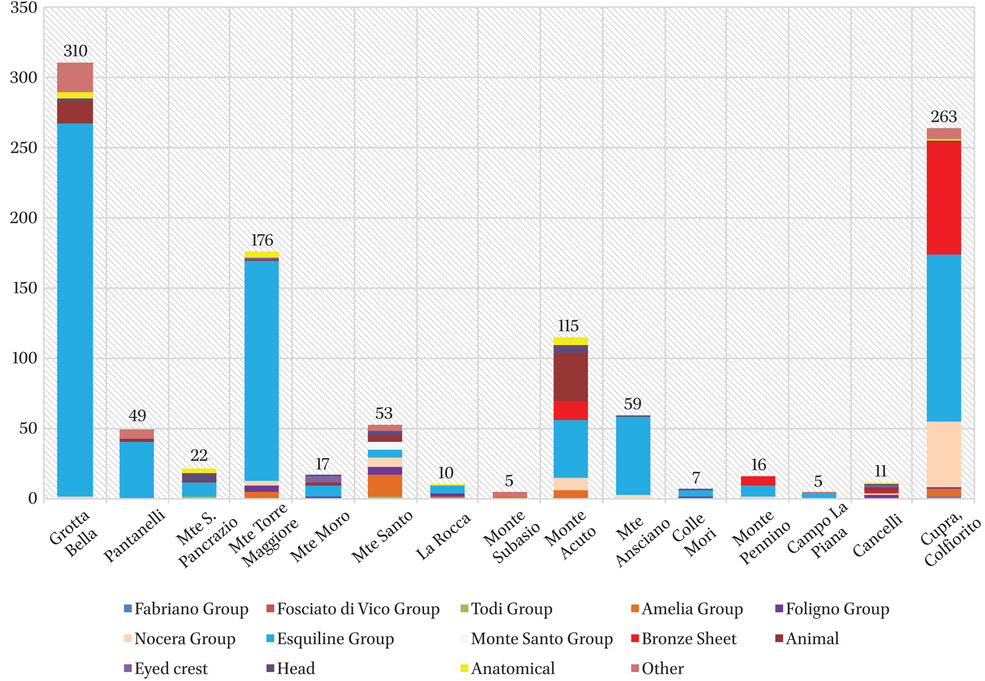
Typological distribution of votive figurines across Umbrian sanctuaries

Large quantities of votive objects have been uncovered at Umbrian sites, perhaps indicating that votive dedication was a ubiquitous aspect of Umbrian religious life. It was common for Umbrian votive artifacts to portray body parts, perhaps due to a belief that such depictions could induce certain medical benefits. Umbrian votives also frequently human warriors or individuals with outstretched arms, who were presumably supplicating a deity. The extremities of these figurines were typically sharp and pointed, and they were sometimes marked by oblique incisions which could denote the fingers or the feet. Animal depictions were also common in Umbrian votive art, perhaps due to some association with sacrificial animals or pastoralism. Agrarian themes may likewise underlie the warrior figurines, which themselves may be associated with Mars—a deity often connected to agriculture in Italic religion. Such Mars figurines often appear on routes connecting the Adriatic Sea and the Apennine mountains, which may imply worship of Mars in his agricultural capacity, perhaps as a guardian of pastoralists and transhumance. Arianna Pavia argues that Umbrian votives may have served as metonymical representations of broader concepts pertaining to daily life within Umbrian society. According to this theory, the anatomical votives functioned as figurative depictions of human individuals and the warrior votives were associated with protection from any potential threats.

Votive objects were perhaps created and sold at the sanctuary sites themselves, as the remains of metal slags from Grotta Bella and Monte Torre Maggiore attest to the local manufacture of metallic substances. Typically, the votives were composed of bronze, although several examples of lead votives have been uncovered at Pantanelli and Grotta Bella. Stylistically, Umbrian votives are comparable with other contemporary statuettes uncovered in Latium, which may attest to underlying shared cultural elements governing the design of the votives in both areas. However, analysis of Italic figurines conducted utilizing X-ray fluorescence has indicated that Umbrian figurines contained less iron than the statuettes from the Esquiline hill in Rome. Discrepancies in iron contents between the two regions may itself suggest that the areas differed in regard to their metalworking technology, with Rome perhaps possessing more advanced smithing techniques.

Spikes or spurs were often attached to the bottoms of votive objects, which may indicate that they were fixed to some object for display. This theory is further corroborated by the discovery of nails at multiple Umbrian sanctuaries, which—according to the archaeologist Arianna Pavia—may have been used to connect wooden planks together or to attach these planks to other structures. Pavia further suggests that certain figurines forged from bronze or lead sheets may have been suspended from holes pierced through the metallic surface, citing the presence of one such bronze sheet from Monte San Pancrazio that contains a hole within its surface. In the pit at Monte Torre Maggiore, a coin of Commodus was unearthed in the same layer as sets of archaic votives, indicating that the well remained uncovered, with the votives on display, from the archaic period to at least the 2nd-century CE.

Most votives were of relatively simple construction, perhaps indicating that they were deposited by less affluent individuals, whereas the few elaborately crafted bronzes may have been provided by higher-status persons. However, the metal utilized to produce the votives was itself usually valuable, which may indicate that they were all left by wealthy individuals who each may have dedicated numerous votive offerings. Alternatively, Pavia argues that the extreme rarity of more elaborate figurines may indicate that the deposition of ostentatious votives was generally avoided in Umbrian culture, even if the suppliant could afford such expenses. Regardless, if the ceremonial offering of votives was available to every Umbrian, even those of low status, then the ritual may have functioned as a communal activity and therefore may have reinforced a shared sense of group identity. Furthermore, Pavia notes that numerous Umbrian sanctuaries contain types of votive figurine exclusive to that sanctuary. For instance, the site of Monte Santo included several statuettes likely produced by a local artisan that, although somewhat similar to more common styles of Umbrian figurine, were still largely unique. According to Pavia, Umbrian sanctuaries may have adopted distinctive styles of votives to assert their own individuality as a community among the broader Umbrian populace.

== Political structure ==
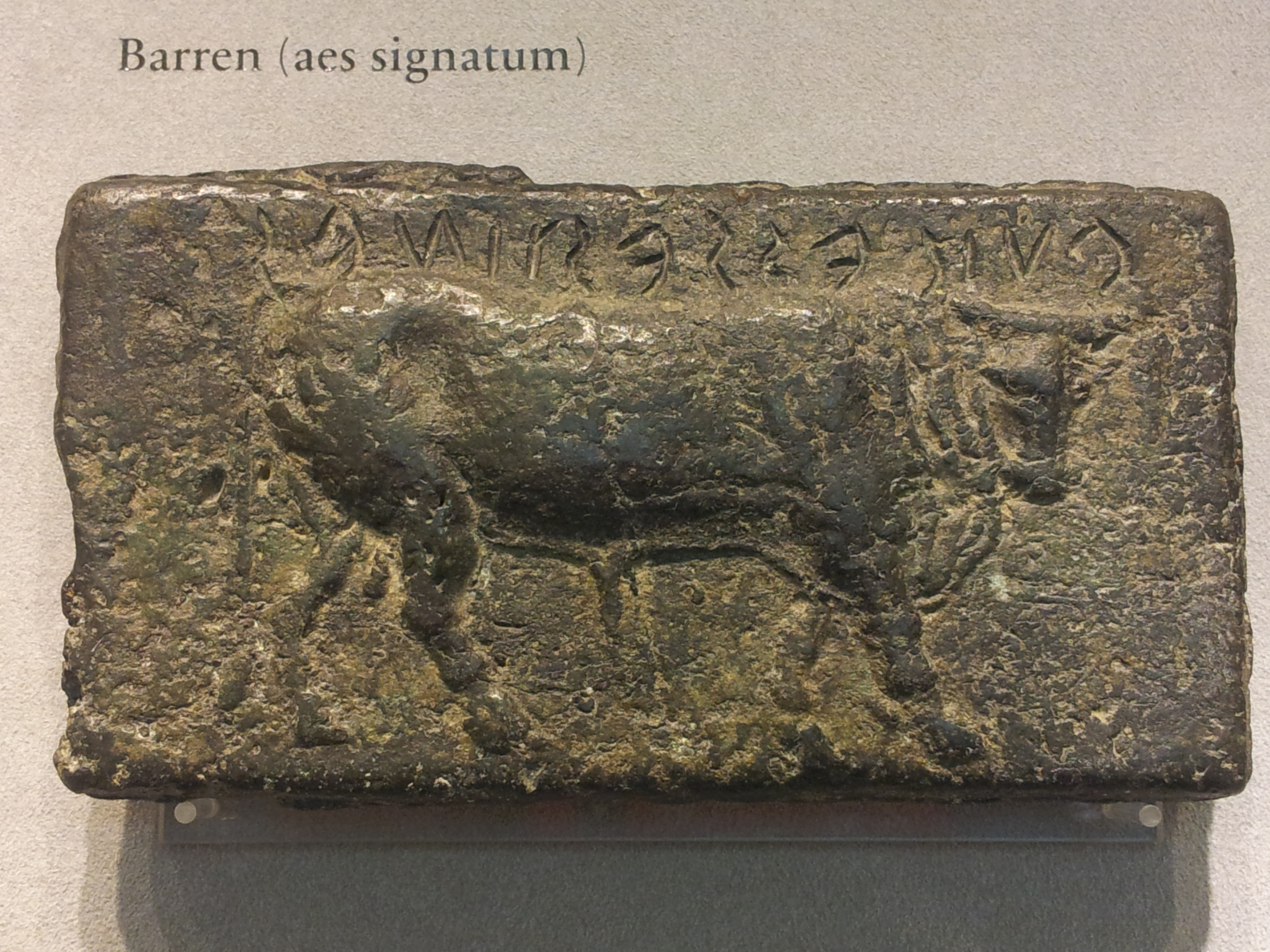
Bronze bar with inscription in Umbrian language

While there is little direct information about ancient Umbrian political structure, it is fairly clear that two men held the supreme magistracy of uhtur and were responsible for supervising rituals. Other civic offices included the marone, which had a lower status than uhtur (closely related to Latin auctor whence English "author"), and a religious position named kvestur (cognate to or a borrowing of Latin Quaestor). The Umbrian social structure was divided into distinct groups probably based upon military rank. During the reign of Augustus, four Umbrian aristocrats became senators. Emperor Nerva's family was from Umbria.

According to Guy Jolyon Bradley, " The religious sites of the region have been thought to reveal a society dominated by agricultural and pastoral concerns, to which town life came late in comparison to Etruria."

== Roman influence ==
Throughout the 9th-4th centuries BC, imported goods from Greece and Etruria were common, as well as the production of local pottery.

The Romans first made contact with Umbria in 310 BC and settled Latin colonies there in 299 BC, 268 BC and 241 BC. They had completed their conquest of Umbria by approximately 260 BC. The Via Flaminia linking areas of Umbria was complete by 220 BC. Cities in Umbria also contributed troops to Rome for its many wars. Umbrians fought under Scipio Africanus in 205 BC during the Second Punic War. The Praetorian Guard recruited from Etruria and Umbria. The Umbri played a minor role in the Social War and as a result were granted citizenship in 90 BC. Roman veterans were settled in Umbria during the reign of Augustus.

== Prominent Umbri ==
=== Gentes of Umbrian origin ===
- Accia gens
- Annaea gens
- Belliena gens
- Cocceia gens
- Fuficia gens
- Luciena gens
- Peducaea gens
- Propertia gens
- Rustia gens
- Scoedia gens
- Sibidiena gens
- Titulena gens
- Ulpia gens
- Umbrena gens
- Umbria gens
- Umbricia gens

=== Romans of Umbrian ancestry ===
- Nerva, Roman emperor
- Trajan, Roman emperor
- Seneca the Elder, rhetorician and writer
- Seneca the Younger, Stoic philosopher, statesman and dramatist

== Genetics ==
A 2020 analysis of maternal haplogroups from ancient and modern samples indicated a substantial genetic similarity among the modern inhabitants of Umbria and the area's ancient pre-Roman inhabitants, and evidence of substantial genetic continuity in the region from pre-Roman times to the present with regard to mitochondrial DNA. Both modern and ancient Umbrians were found to have high rates of mtDNA haplogroups U4 and U5a, and an overrepresentation of J (at roughly 30%). The study also found that, "local genetic continuities are further attested to by six terminal branches (H1e1, J1c3, J2b1, U2e2a, U8b1b1 and K1a4a)" also shared by ancient and modern Umbrians.

== See also ==
- Umbrian language
- List of ancient peoples of Italy
- Gens of Sabine origin
- Gens of Volscian origin
