= Titulena gens =

Ancient Roman family

The gens Titulena or Titulenia was an obscure plebeian family at ancient Rome. No members of this gens are mentioned in Roman writers, but several are known from inscriptions, of whom the most illustrious must have been Lucius Titulenus, a second-century governor of Raetia.

== Origin ==
The nomen Titulenus belongs to a class of gentilicia formed from the names of places or cognomina ending in -inus. The root seems to be the cognomen Titulus, a diminutive of the praenomen Titus. Names of this type were common among gentes of Umbrian origin, and several of the Tituleni were natives of Fanum Fortunae in Umbria, or from neighboring towns from the same region.

== Praenomina ==
The Tituleni known from epigraphy used several common praenomina, particularly Lucius, but also Gaius, Marcus, Quintus, and Titus. One early inscription indicates that the Tituleni also used the praenomen Vibius, which was uncommon at Rome, but more widespread in the rest of Italy.

== Members ==
This list includes abbreviated praenomina. For an explanation of this practice, see filiation.

- Titulenus V. f., named in an inscription from Reate in Samnium, dating from 171 BC.
- Titulenus, one of the quattuorvirs at Iguvium in Umbria, at some point in the latter half of the first century BC.
- Quintus Titulenus Q. f. Major, dedicated a tomb at Camerinum in Umbria, dating between 30 BC and the middle of the first century, for Vibia, perhaps his daughter, aged twelve.
- Titulena Galatia, built a first-century tomb at Rome for her son, Marcus Titulenus Justus.
- Marcus Titulenus Justus, a boy buried at Rome, aged seven years, nine months, fifteen days, and eight hours, in a tomb built by his mother, Titulena Galatia.
- Titus Titulenus Isauricus, buried in a late first-century tomb at Rome, dedicated by his wife, Julia Tyche.
- Titulena Justa, dedicated a second-century family sepulchre at Rome for herself and her husband, Marcus Junius Dionysius, a physician.
- Lucius Titulenus L. f., procurator, or governor of Raetia, probably during the reign of Antoninus Pius or slightly earlier. An inscription from Fanum Fortunae in Umbria records his military and political career: he had been one of the duumvirs, aedile, quaestor, prefect of a cohort and of an Ala, and military tribune of a Roman legion.
- Titulenius Boniatus, made a donation to the cult of Vulcan at Celeia in Noricum, dating between AD 195 and 205.
- Lucius Titulenius L. f. Respectus, a veteran of the Legio X Gemina, made an offering to Jupiter Optimus Maximus at Burnum in Dalmatia, dating between the middle of the second century, and the end of the third. He was buried at Tragurium, also in Dalmatia, in a tomb built by his wife, Titia Myrsine.
- Titulenia Justina, dedicated a third-century tomb at Sorviodurum in Raetia for her husband, Julius Primitivus, a former soldier, aged sixty.
- Lucius Titulenus L. l. Tertius, a freedman, was a native of Fanum Fortunae, and became one of the Seviri Augustales. He was buried in a third-century tomb at Fanum Fortunae, along with a boy named Lucius Titulenus Ursio, perhaps his son.
- Lucius Titulenus Ursio, a boy buried in a third-century tomb at Fanum Fortunae, aged twelve, together with Lucius Titulenus Tertius, perhaps his father. The sepulchral inscription describes him as the freedman of a woman named Titulena.

=== Undated Tituleni ===
- Gaius Titulenius, buried at Rome.
- Titulena T. f. Polla, the wife of Quintus Vettesius Scaeva, and mother of Quintus Vettesius Quadratus, who built a family sepulchre at Reate for himself, his parents, his sister, Vettesia Sabina, and their freedmen and freedwomen.

== See also ==
- List of Roman gentes

== Bibliography ==
- Theodor Mommsen et alii, Corpus Inscriptionum Latinarum (The Body of Latin Inscriptions, abbreviated CIL), Berlin-Brandenburgische Akademie der Wissenschaften (1853–present).
- René Cagnat et alii, L'Année épigraphique (The Year in Epigraphy, abbreviated AE), Presses Universitaires de France (1888–present).
- George Davis Chase, "The Origin of Roman Praenomina", in Harvard Studies in Classical Philology, vol. VIII, pp. 103–184 (1897).
- Opuscula Romana: Annual of the Swedish Institute in Rome, (1954–2007).
