= Grotta Bella =

Cave in Umbria

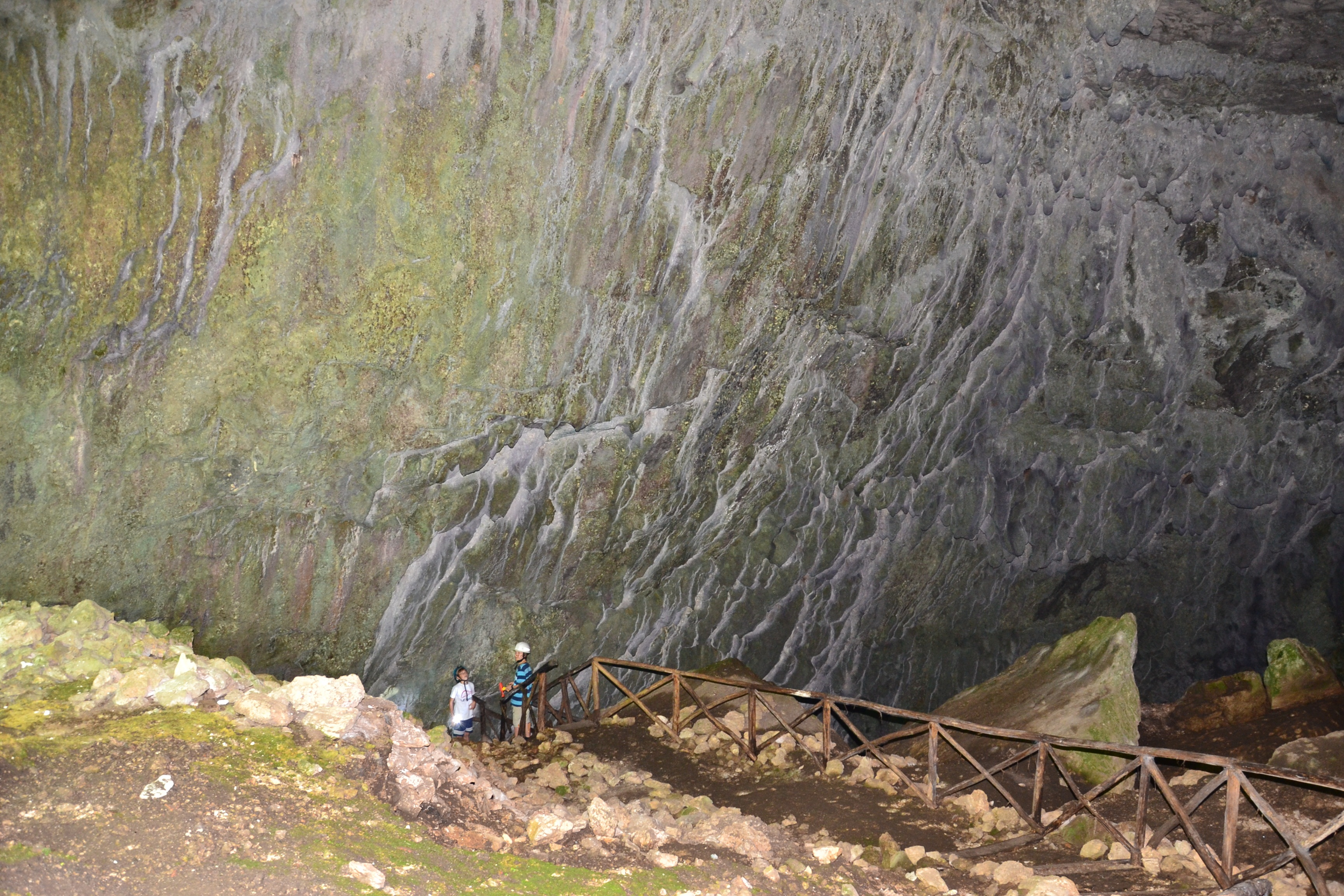
- The cave of Grotta Bella
- Interactive map of Grotta Bella
- Location: Terni, Umbria, Italy
- Coordinates: 42°38′20″N 12°22′9″E
- Depth: 31 m (102 ft)
- Discovery: 1902
- Entrances: 1

Grotta Bella is a cave and archaeological site located near Avigliano Umbro in Italy. Excavations at the site have indicated that the cave was inhabited by humans from the 5th-millennium BCE to the 4th-century CE. The early population of the cave, during the Neolithic, appear to have primarily dwelled within the Entrance Hall of the site. However, it is likely that they utilized the deepest part of the cave—the Sala dello Scheletro ("Skeleton Hall")—as a burial ground. By the 6th-century BCE, the cave functioned as a religious site for the Umbrian people, who deposited numerous votives in the area. Like other Umbrian sites, the majority of the votives at Grotta Bella were composed of bronze, although—unlike most Umbrian sites—the cave contained multiple votives fashioned from lead. The site remained active following the Roman conquest and persisted until at least the 4th-century CE, although usage of the cave declined significantly following Roman occupation.

== Terrain ==
The site is situated on the northeastern side of the Monte L’Aiola, which is itself within the Amerini mountain range. The entrance of the cave directly leads into the first room: The so-called "Entrance Hall," which is forty meters wide at its major axis, thirty meters wide at its minor axis, and—on average—ten meters tall. At the southern end of the Entrance Hall, the cave splits into three divergent paths. One such route, the "Condotta Preistorica" ("Prehistoric passageway"), leads into the Sala dello Scheletro ("Skeleton Hall"), which is located thirty-one meters below the entrance in elevation and is currently the deepest known part of the cave. Nearby the Prehistoric passageway lies the "Ramo delle Firme ("Signature Branch")," named so for the presence of numerous signatures inscribed into the walls by the various individuals who have entered the cave over the centuries. The Signature Branch leads into two additional areas: The "Diverticolo delle firme" ("Side passageway of the Signature Branch") and the "Sala Santa Restituta" ("Hall of Santa Restituta"), which is located thirty meters below the entrance. The "Via delle Strettoie" ("Narrow Passageway") is situated to the east of the Signature Branch and consists of various pathways that are difficult to navigate.

== Archaeology ==
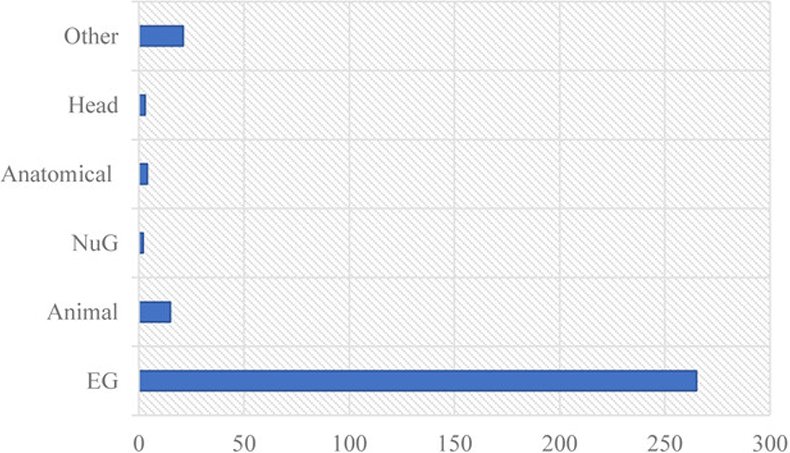
Typological distribution of votive objects at Grotta Bella from the 6th-4th centuries BCE.

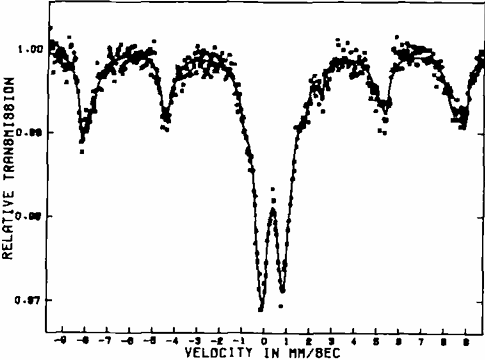
Mössbauer spectrum of a sample of clay artifacts from Grotta Bella.

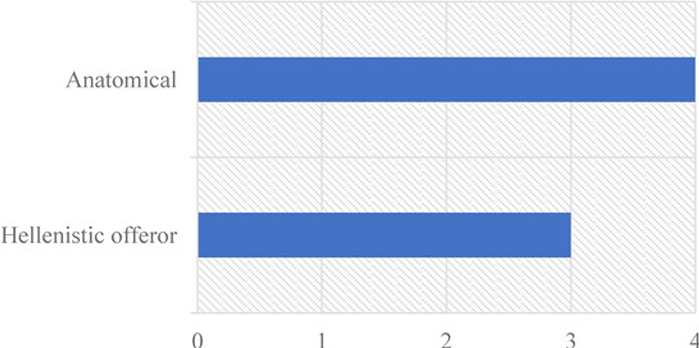
Typology of votive artifacts in Grotta Bella dated between the 4th to the early 1st-century BCE.

The site was first recorded in 1902 by the geologist Bernardino Lotti, although the area was not extensively analyzed until the 1950s, when a team of speleologists examined and mapped the cave. Archaeological excavations were first conducted at the site from 1970-1973 by the University of Milan and the Soprintendenza per i Beni Archeologici dell’Umbria. Later excavations conducted by the Gruppo Speleologico Todi in the 1990s explored the deepest layers of the site, uncovering new areas in the process, such as the Skeleton Hall. This same area was reexamined from 2019-2021 by the Enzo dei Medici, an Italian organization dedicated to speleological research.

Archaeological investigation of the site has indicated that the cave was occupied by various peoples from the 5th-millennium BCE to the 4th-century CE. Human habitation in the cave, during the Neolithic, was primarily concentrated within the immediate entrance hall. The material of this area was characterized by domestic items such as hearths, the remains of meals, stone or metal tools, millstones, obsidians, flints, and painted wares. Besides the natural shelter provided by any cave, it is likely that Grotta Bella was particularly attractive to early humans because the entrance section was thoroughly lit by sunlight and because—during wet seasons—water would accumulate on and drip from the stalactites, thereby providing an accessible, albeit seasonal, source of water. In contrast to the relatively accommodating entrance area, the deepest known section of the cave—the Skeleton Hall—was devoid of natural light and difficult to navigate. This area likely lacked any significant human settlement, though it was probably utilized as a burial ground by the prehistoric population of the site, as multiple bones belong to at least nine separate individuals were uncovered within this remote section of the cave. The presence of domestic animal bones at the site may indicate that the area was frequented by farmers during the Middle Neolithic.

By the 6th-century BCE, the settlement had emerged as a cult site associated with the Umbrian culture. In particular, the site appears to have been connected by road to the nearby Umbrian city of Ameria. Unlike other Umbrian ritual spaces, the cave of Grotta Bella lacked any manmade buildings associated with religious activity. According to the archaeologist Guy Bradley, it is possible that the preexisting structure of the cave may have removed the need for additional construction. Numerous votive objects were deposited at the site, including 286 figurines and 24 aes rude, the majority of which were composed of bronze and stylistically identifiable with numerous other similar artifacts throughout Umbria. Of these votives, 265 typologically belonged to the "Esquiline" group of Umbrian artifacts, a class defined by the presence of a lanky body with an incised mouth and the usage of grooves to denote the eyes and, in some cases, the fingers. There only two figurines at Grotta Bella that belong to the "Nocera Umbra" class of objects, both of which are characterized by flat and thin bodies with wide spaces between the legs and a relatively thick head adorned with a helmet. It is likely that both these artifacts depict warriors, as they both contain holes in their hands that were most probably designed to hold a spear. Alongside human figurines, there were fifteen animal figurines, including one goat, two sheep, five pigs, six cows, and another unidentified animal.

However, there were twenty-one votives that were, unusually, crafted from lead instead of bronze. These artifacts are only typologically paralleled by artifacts from the nearby city of Pantanelli, and were most likely created at a later date than the Bronze votives. The lead items are further distinguished from the bronze sculptures by their lack of nails, which were usually affixed to the bottom of the votive possibly to allow for the object to be attached to a tree. One lead warrior statuette was hidden within a crevice in a rock, perhaps indicating that at least certain votive offerings were not intended to be publicly displayed. Amongst these peculiar lead votives, there were nine miniature lead shields, each of which was marked by various symbols on its frontside and an arm clasping its backside. Alongside the shields, there were thirteen lead statuettes depicting human figures, of which seven were male and six were female. The male figurines appear to portray warriors, as the statuettes are depicted with raised right arms, perhaps to represent the wielding of a sword or spear. In contrast to the male figurines, which were clothed only in armor and a chitoniskos, the female sculptures were bedecked in tunics and fashioned their hair in a ponytail-like shape.

Unlike other Umbrian sanctuaries, Grotta Bella was not abandoned following the Roman conquest; the site remained in use from the 4th-century BCE to the 4th-century CE. It is possible that the site was briefly abandoned during the 1st-century BCE, around the time of the Social War, as there is a temporary dearth of evidence from this time frame. The vast majority of artifacts from Grotta Bella date to the period before the Roman occupation, and there is only scant evidence for human habitation of the site following the early 1st-century BCE. The three bronze statuettes dated between the 3rd and the 2nd century BCE were all fashioned in Hellenistic styles: Two portray male figures ornamented with laurel wreathes and himatia and holding acerrae and paterae, and another depicts a female suppliant dressed in a chiton holding her arms outstretched. There are seventy-nine coins at the site, most of which are asses dated to the early Roman Republic, as they include depictions of the bow of a ship, a motif that appeared on Roman currency following the maritime successes of the empire during the Punic Wars. Moreover, among the artifacts dated between the 4th-century BCE and the early 1st-century BCE, there are four terracotta depictions of human body parts—such a breast or feet—and also one terracotta model of a temple.
