= Polyidus of Thessaly =

Ancient Greek military engineer

Polyidus of Thessaly (also Polyides, Polydus; Ancient Greek: Πολύειδος ὁ Θεσσαλός, Polúeidos ho Thessalós, English translation: "much beauty", from polus, "many, much" and eidos, "form, appearance, beauty") was an ancient Greek military engineer of Philip, who made improvements in the covered battering-ram (testudo arietaria, poliorceticus krios) during Philip's siege of Byzantium in 340 BC. His students were Diades of Pella and Charias, who served in the campaigns of Alexander the Great. Polyidus was the inventor of Helepolis.

== Sources ==
- Vitruvius. x. 19. s. 13. §3.
- Campbell, Duncan B. Greek and Roman Siege Machinery 399 BC-AD 363. Osprey Publishing, 2003. ISBN 1-84176-605-4
