= Diades of Pella =

Ancient Greek military engineer

Diades of Pella (Ancient Greek: Διάδης Πελλαίος, romanized: Diádēs Pellaíos), surnamed the "Besieger" (Πολιορκητής, Poliorkētḗs), was a Thessalian inventor of many siege engines, student of Philip II's military engineer Polyidus of Thessaly.

He lived in the 4th century BC. Diades accompanied Alexander the Great in his campaigns to the East. He constructed (or improved) movable towers, battering rams, scaling engines used to scale walls and battering cranes used for the destruction of city walls. Diades was known as "the man who took Tyre with Alexander". He also wrote a treatise on machinery. (Vitruvius vii, introduction)
