= Lucius Vitruvius Cerdo =

Ancient Roman architect

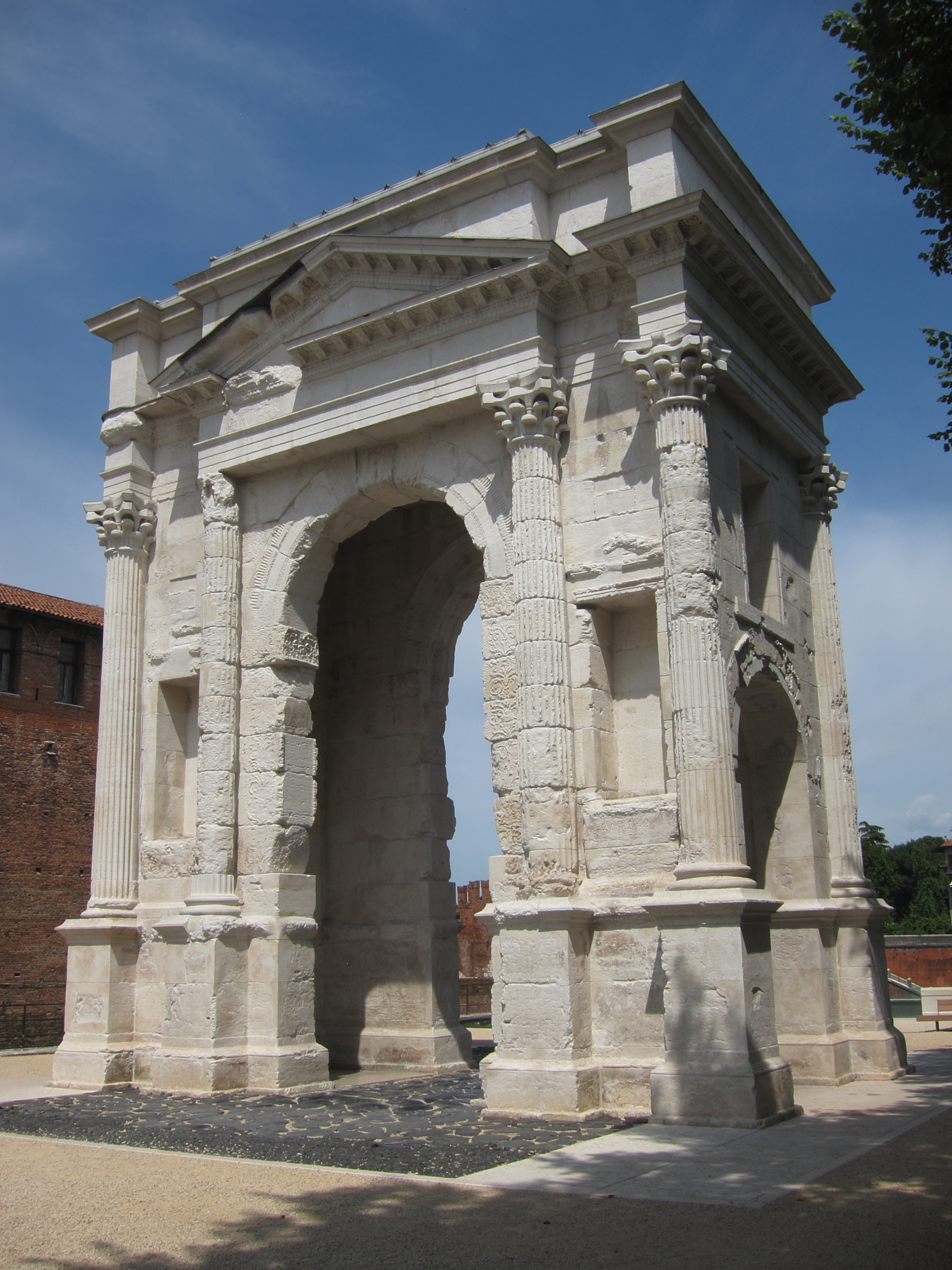
Arco dei Gavi (Verona)

Lucius Vitruvius Cerdo was an ancient Roman architect active in Verona. His only known work is the Arco dei Gavi, a 1st-century arch in Verona, Italy. The arch is inscribed "Lucius Vitruvius Cerdo, a freedman of Lucius", which has led to Verona being suggested as the birthplace of the earlier and better-known architect Marcus Vitruvius Pollio.
