= Monte Ansciano =

Mountain and archaeological site in Italy

Naming
- Native name: Monte Ansciano

Geography
- Country: Italy
- Region: Umbria

Monte Ansciano is a mountain and archaeological site in Umbria, Italy. Alongside with Monte Ingino, the site at Ansciano overlooks the modern city of Gubbio.

== History ==
The site belonged to the Proto-Villanovan Chiusi-Chetona archaeological complex, which encompassed parts of central and potentially northern Etruria. One type of artifact discovered at Ansciano, a class of winged axes with concave blade edges, is exclusive to this particular region. Excavations at Ansciano have also uncovered an oval hut and an ancient midden encircled by a wall, both dating back to the Final Bronze Age and Early Iron Age (1200-1000 BCE). Around 12,000 preserved remnants of animals such sheep, cows, and pigs dating to this same period were discovered at Ansciano, which perhaps reflects a type of ritual consumption practice. Moreover, archaeologists unearthed samples of ivory combs at Ansciano similar to others uncovered at Frattesina. There is little evidence for the usage of the site from the 10th-century to the 6th-century BCE, though there is one ritual deposit of a 9th-8th century BCE bronze and iron fibula. During the Late Bronze Age, there was a village situated on the slopes of Monte Ansciano.

Following the early Iron Age, Ansciano was later reused as a sanctuary space by the Umbrian people. Like other Umbrian sanctuaries, the site contained architectural remains—specifically, in the case of Ansciano, a dry-stone platform, which—in the 6th-century BCE—was placed atop the earlier Bronze Age wall. As is common for Umbrian ritual spaces, the Ansciano sanctuary is placed atop a mountain, though it exists upon a smaller peak than the Umbrian sanctuaries at areas such as Monte Pennino and Monte Maggiore, all of which are generally the tallest location in the nearby area. Numerous Umbrian artifacts were uncovered at Ansciano, including votive bronzes and pottery, perhaps with accompanying depictions of human faces, and an aes rude dated to the 3rd-century BCE. It is possible that religious activity at the site persisted following the Roman conquest, as indicated by the remains of Republican-era coins and lamps and drinking cups dating to the period of the Roman Empire. However, according to the archaeologist Guy Bradley, it is probable that any persistent usage of the site was infrequent.

Amongst the artifact assemblage, there were sixty-five figurines, all of which were of typically Umbrian style and datable to between the 5th and 3rd centuries BCE. The majority of these sculptures were of the "Esquiline" type of Umbrian figurine, though there were three "Mars" type figures. Due to the finding of 169 nails and several pieces of decorated terracotta at the area, it has been suggested that the figurines were originally attached to a wooden panel or the bark of trees. It is perhaps possible that the total number of sixty-five figurines, when compared with the at least 200 year-long usage of the site, implies a relatively low level of activity at the area, though the archaeologist Guy Bradley suggests that—since these artifacts had been discovered in disparate locations across the area—it is likely that the recoverable figurines from Ansciano were only those that were misplaced in some manner, perhaps by falling from their screens. However, Bradley has also suggested that the nails may indicate the existence of a "wooden superstructure," though he concedes that this theory is weakened by the lack of excavated post holes in area.
