= Epimachus of Athens =

Athenian engineer and architect

Epimachus of Athens (Ancient Greek: Ἐπίμαχος ὁ Ἀθήναιος, romanized: Epímachos ho Athḗnaios, c. 300 BC) was a renowned Athenian engineer and architect who is known to have constructed the Helepolis (literally, Taker of Cities), a huge siege machine first conceptualised by Demetrius I of Macedon and built to be employed in the unsuccessful siege of Rhodes.

== Life ==
Few particular details are known about Epimachus of Athens' life. He built other unique siege weapons, aside from the Helepolis, some for Demetrius I of Macedon, and others for various other leaders and warlords. Of these other siege weapons was a large battering ram over 60 metres long. Many of his creations had visible effects on future siege engineering, hundreds of years later, and the design for the Helepolis in particular had effects on future designs; the term Helepolis endured for many centuries after the "original", used for any similar, tower-like siege machine.

== The Helepolis ==
The design for the Helepolis was based on that of an earlier and smaller siege machine, used against Salamis at around 305 BC, but it was Epimachus of Athens who actually co-ordinated the construction of the siege machine. Assuming the figures recorded in the writings of several ancient historians, including Diocleides of Abdera, Vitruvius and Plutarch are accurate, the Helepolis was and remains the largest siege machine ever erected; it was a colossal, tapered, tower-like structure 60 feet (20 metres approx.) in width, with each side over 125 feet (42 metres approx.) high. It rested on eight, 12-foot (3.7 m) high wheels, allowing mobility, and it also had casters to accommodate lateral movement.

All exposed sides of the helepolis were rigidly defended; iron plates protected the wooden structure from possible inflammation, and additional defences, such as great stretches of hide plastered on the interior, were placed to withstand the power of ballista and catapult assault. The inside of the machine was divided into nine separate stories, each accessible through a long flight of stairs that wound from the ground floor to the very top. Over 3,600 men were needed as crew, working in relays to drive the helepolis, which weighed over 160 tons.

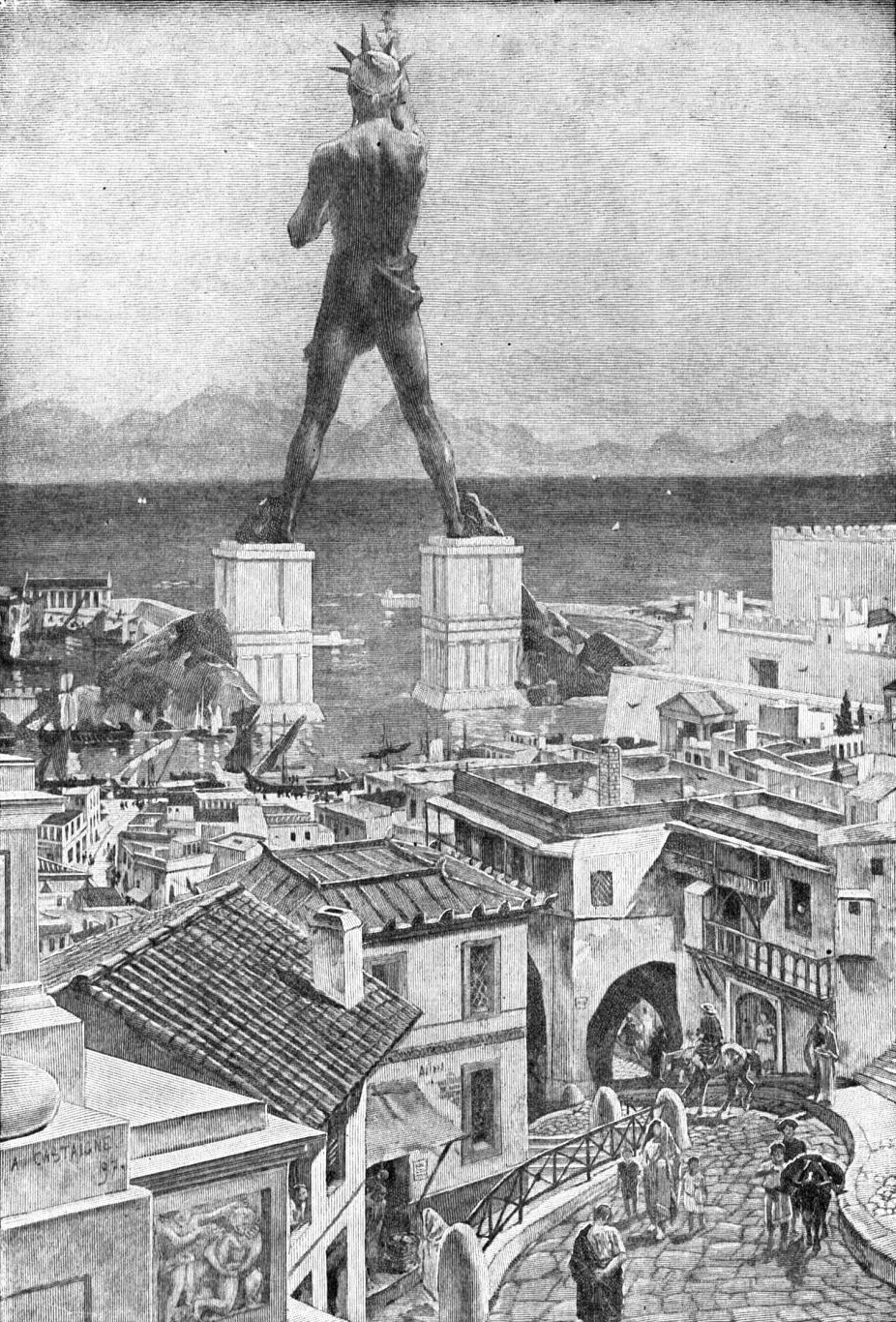
The Colossus of Rhodes, constructed from the materials first used in the building of the Helepolis.

In addition to being strongly defended, the helepolis was powerfully armed; several catapults and balistas were placed on each of the floors, each outlooking the battlefield through large shutters. On the higher floors, dart throwers, among others, were stationed.

=== The siege ===
Despite the seemingly indestructible design of the Helepolis, many of the iron plates were dislodged during the siege, rendering the great machine highly vulnerable. Fearing that the laboriously constructed Helepolis would fall victim to the intense fire that was directed towards it, Demetrius I of Macedon ordered that it be withdrawn from the war field to prevent any further damage. Following a long period of assault, the siege was abandoned after it was realised that the fortifications of Rhodes were too powerful and well defended. Among other uniquely designed siege machines employed by Demetrius was a giant ram over 60 metres long, requiring over 1000 men to operate, and which was also designed by Epimachus of Athens.

After the siege, the Helepolis was abandoned near Rhodes, despite Demetrius' desire to keep it from harm during the Siege. The people of Rhodes melted down its metal plating and used the materials to build the Colossus of Rhodes.
