= Vitruvius =

1st-century BC Roman architect and engineer

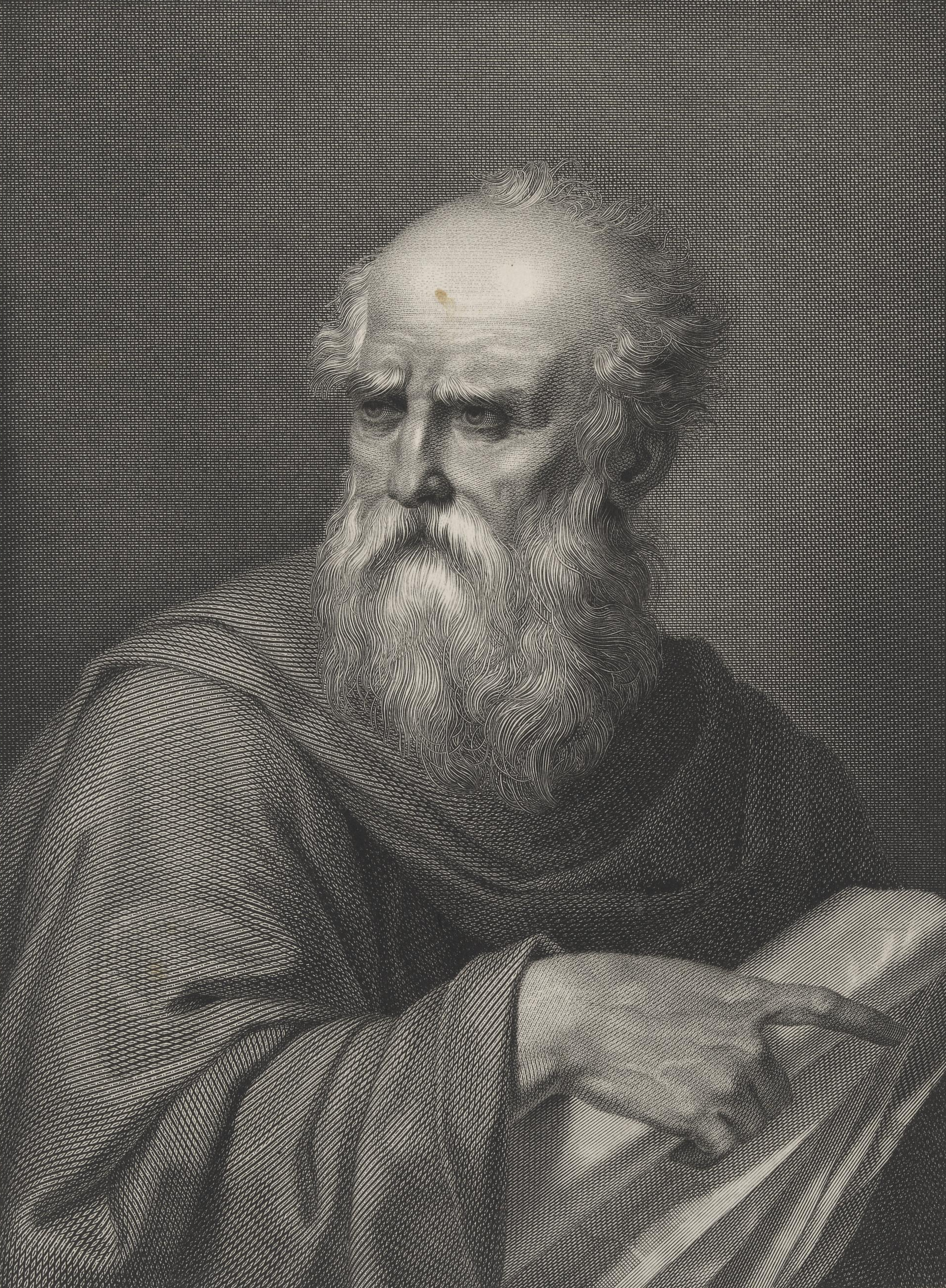
- Engraving by Jacopo Bernardi after Vincenzo Raggio, 1823 or 1847
- Born: 80–70 BC; Roman Republic
- Died: after 15 BC (aged 55–65)
- Occupations: Author; architect; civil engineer; military engineer
- Notable work: De architectura

Vitruvius (/vɪˈtruːviəs/ vi-TROO-vee-əs; Latin: [wɪˈtruːwi.ʊs]; c. 80–70 BC – after c. 15 BC) was a Roman architect and engineer during the 1st century BC, known for his multi-volume work titled De architectura. As the only treatise on architecture to survive from antiquity, it has been regarded since the Renaissance as the first book on architectural theory, as well as a major source on the canon of classical architecture. It is not clear to what extent his contemporaries regarded his book as original or important.

He states that all buildings should have three attributes: firmitas, utilitas, and venustas ("strength", "utility", and "beauty"), principles reflected in much Ancient Roman architecture. His discussion of perfect proportion in architecture and the human body led to the famous Renaissance drawing of the Vitruvian Man by Leonardo da Vinci.

Little is known about Vitruvius' life, but by his own description he served as an artilleryman, the third class of arms in the Roman military offices. He probably served as a senior officer of artillery in charge of doctores ballistarum (artillery experts) and libratores who actually operated the machines. As an army engineer he specialized in the construction of ballista and scorpio artillery war machines for sieges. It is possible that Vitruvius served with Julius Caesar's chief engineer Lucius Cornelius Balbus.

Vitruvius' De architectura was well-known and widely copied in the Middle Ages and survives in many dozens of manuscripts, though in 1414 it was "rediscovered" by the Florentine humanist Poggio Bracciolini in the library of Saint Gall Abbey. Leon Battista Alberti published it in his seminal treatise on architecture, De re aedificatoria (c. 1450). The first known Latin printed edition was by Fra Giovanni Sulpitius in Rome in 1486. Translations followed in Italian, French, English, German, Spanish, and several other languages. Though any original illustrations have been lost, the first illustrated edition was published in Venice in 1511 by Fra Giovanni Giocondo, with woodcut illustrations based on descriptions in the text. Bramante, Michelangelo, Palladio, Vignola and earlier architects are known to have studied the work of Vitruvius, and consequently it has had a significant impact on the architecture of many European countries.

== Life and career ==
Little is known about Vitruvius' life. Most inferences about him are extracted from his only surviving work, De Architectura. His full name is sometimes given as "Marcus Vitruvius Pollio", but both the first and last names are uncertain. Marcus Cetius Faventinus writes of "Vitruvius Polio aliique auctores"; this can be read as "Vitruvius Polio, and other authors" or, less likely, as "Vitruvius, Polio, and other authors". An inscription in Verona, which names a Lucius Vitruvius Cordo, and an inscription from Thilbilis in North Africa, which names a Marcus Vitruvius Mamurra have been suggested as evidence that Vitruvius and Mamurra (who was a military praefectus fabrum under Julius Caesar) were from the same family; or were even the same individual. Neither association, however, is borne out by De Architectura (which Vitruvius dedicated to Augustus), nor by the little that is known of Mamurra.

Vitruvius was a military engineer (praefectus fabrum), or a praefect architectus armamentarius of the apparitor status group (a branch of the Roman civil service). He is mentioned in Pliny the Elder's table of contents for Naturalis Historia (Natural History), in the heading for mosaic techniques. Frontinus refers to "Vitruvius the architect" in his late 1st-century work De aquaeductu.

Likely born a free Roman citizen, by his own account Vitruvius served in the Roman army under Caesar with the otherwise poorly identified Marcus Aurelius, Publius Minidius, and Gnaeus Cornelius. These names vary depending on the edition of De architectura. Publius Minidius is also written as Publius Numidicus and Publius Numidius, speculated as the same Publius Numisius inscribed on the Roman Theatre at Heraclea.

As an army engineer he specialized in the construction of ballista and scorpio artillery war machines for sieges. It is speculated that Vitruvius served with Caesar's chief engineer Lucius Cornelius Balbus.

The locations where he served can be reconstructed from, for example, descriptions of the building methods of various "foreign tribes". Although he describes places throughout De Architectura, he does not say he was present. His service likely included north Africa, Hispania, Gaul (including Aquitaine), and Pontus.

To place the role of Vitruvius the military engineer in context, a description of "The Prefect of the camp" or army engineer is quoted here as given by Flavius Vegetius Renatus in The Military Institutions of the Romans:

The Prefect of the camp, though inferior in rank to the [Prefect], had a post of no small importance. The position of the camp, the direction of the entrenchments, the inspection of the tents or huts of the soldiers and the baggage were comprehended in his province. His authority extended over the sick, and the physicians who had the care of them; and he regulated the expenses relative thereto. He had the charge of providing carriages, bathhouses and the proper tools for sawing and cutting wood, digging trenches, raising parapets, sinking wells and bringing water into the camp. He likewise had the care of furnishing the troops with wood and straw, as well as the rams, onagri, balistae and all the other engines of war under his direction. This post was always conferred on an officer of great skill, experience and long service, and who consequently was capable of instructing others in those branches of the profession in which he had distinguished himself.

At various locations described by Vitruvius, battles and sieges occurred. He is the only source for the siege of Larignum in 56 BC. Of the battlegrounds of the Gallic War there are references to:

- The siege and massacre of the 40,000 residents at Avaricum in 52 BC. Vercingetorix commented that "the Romans did not conquer by valour nor in the field, but by a kind of art and skill in assault, with which they [Gauls] themselves were unacquainted."
- The broken siege at Gergovia in 52 BC.
- The circumvallation and Battle of Alesia in 52 BC. The women and children of the encircled city were evicted to conserve food, and then starved to death between the opposing walls of the defenders and besiegers.
- The siege of Uxellodunum in 51 BC.

These are all sieges of large Gallic oppida. Of the sites involved in Caesar's civil war, we find the Siege of Massilia in 49 BC (modern France), the Battle of Dyrrhachium of 48 BC (modern Albania), the Battle of Pharsalus in 48 BC (Hellas – Greece), the Battle of Zela of 47 BC (modern Turkey), and the Battle of Thapsus in 46 BC in Caesar's African campaign. A legion that fits the same sequence of locations is the Legio VI Ferrata, of which ballista would be an auxiliary unit.

Mainly known for his writings, Vitruvius was himself an architect. In Roman times architecture was a broader subject than at present including the modern fields of architecture, construction management, construction engineering, chemical engineering, civil engineering, materials engineering, mechanical engineering, military engineering and urban planning; architectural engineers consider him the first of their discipline, a specialization previously known as technical architecture.

In his work describing the construction of military installations, he also commented on the miasma theory – the idea that unhealthy air from wetlands was the cause of illness, saying:

For fortified towns the following general principles are to be observed. First comes the choice of a very healthy site. Such a site will be high, neither misty nor frosty, and in a climate neither hot nor cold, but temperate; further, without marshes in the neighbourhood. For when the morning breezes blow toward the town at sunrise, if they bring with them mists from marshes and, mingled with the mist, the poisonous breath of the creatures of the marshes to be wafted into the bodies of the inhabitants, they will make the site unhealthy. Again, if the town is on the coast with southern or western exposure, it will not be healthy, because in summer the southern sky grows hot at sunrise and is fiery at noon, while a western exposure grows warm after sunrise, is hot at noon, and at evening all aglow.

Frontinus mentions Vitruvius in connection with the standard sizes of pipes: probably the role for which he was most widely respected in Roman times. He is often credited as father of architectural acoustics for describing the technique of echeas placement in theaters. The only building, however, that we know Vitruvius to have worked on is one he tells us about, a basilica completed in 19 BC. It was built at Fanum Fortunae, now the modern town of Fano. The basilica (Italian: "Basilica di Fano") had disappeared so completely that its very site was a matter of conjecture, although various attempts had been made to visualise it. It was ultimately identified and its foundations unearthed in Piazza Andrea Costa, Fano, in January 2026.

In later years the emperor Augustus, through his sister Octavia Minor, sponsored Vitruvius, entitling him with what may have been a pension to guarantee financial independence.

Gerolamo Cardano, in his 1552 book De subtilitate rerum, ranks Vitruvius as one of the 12 persons whom he supposes to have excelled all men in the force of genius and invention; and might have given him first place if it was clear that he had set down his own discoveries.

James Anderson's "The Constitutions of the Free-Masons" (1734), reprinted by Benjamin Franklin, describes Vitruvius as "the Father of all true Architects to this Day."

== De architectura ==
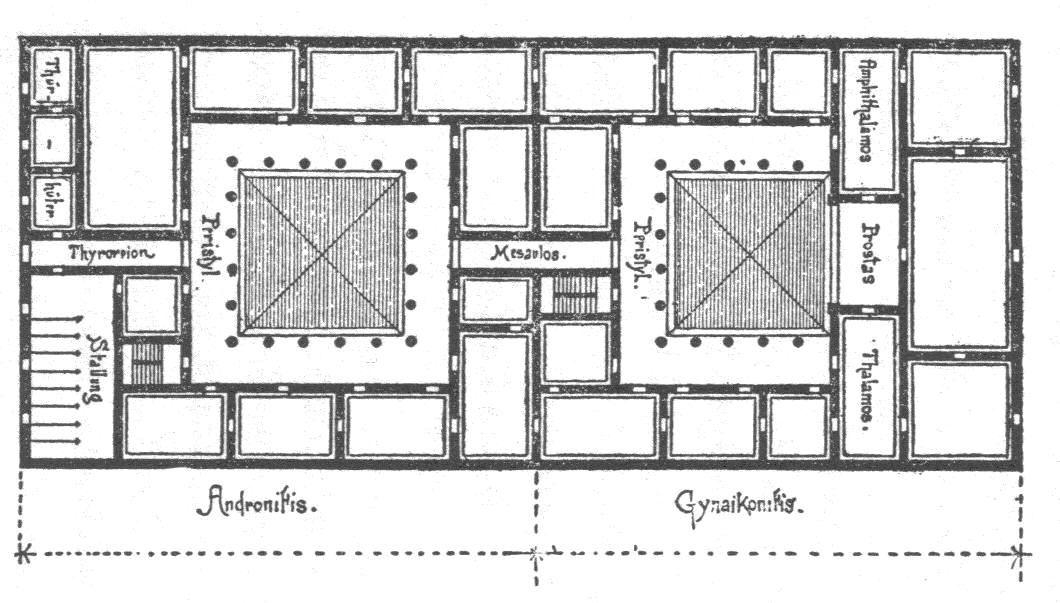
Roman house plan after Vitruvius

Vitruvius is the author of De architectura, libri decem, known today as The Ten Books on Architecture, a treatise written in Latin on architecture, dedicated to the emperor Augustus. This work is the only surviving major book on architecture from classical antiquity. According to Petri Liukkonen, this text "influenced deeply from the Early Renaissance onwards artists, thinkers, and architects, among them Leon Battista Alberti (1404–1472), Leonardo da Vinci (1452–1519), and Michelangelo (1475–1564)."

However, we know there was a significant body of writing about architecture in Greek, where "architects habitually wrote books about their work", including two we know of about the Parthenon alone. To A. W. Lawrence, Vitruvius "has recorded a most elaborate set of rules taken from Greek authors, who must have compiled them gradually in the course of the preceding centuries".

Vitruvius asserts in De architectura that a structure must exhibit the three qualities of firmitatis, utilitatis, venustatis – that is, stability, utility, and beauty. These are sometimes termed the Vitruvian virtues or the Vitruvian Triad. According to Vitruvius, architecture is an imitation of nature: as birds and bees built their nests, so humans constructed housing from natural materials, that gave them shelter against the elements. Vitruvius also wrote about climate in relation to housing architecture and how to choose locations for cities.

The Greeks invented three architectural orders following distinct systems of proportion: Doric, Ionic and Corinthian. These systems were related to their understanding of the proportions the human body. In De Architectura, Vitruvius explained these conventions, detailing the proper proportions of the architectural orders as well as of the ideal man. During the Renaissance, Leonardo da Vinci created his famous drawing of the Vitruvian Man according to these rules, depicting a human body inscribed in a circle and a square (the fundamental geometric patterns of the cosmic order).

=== Scope ===
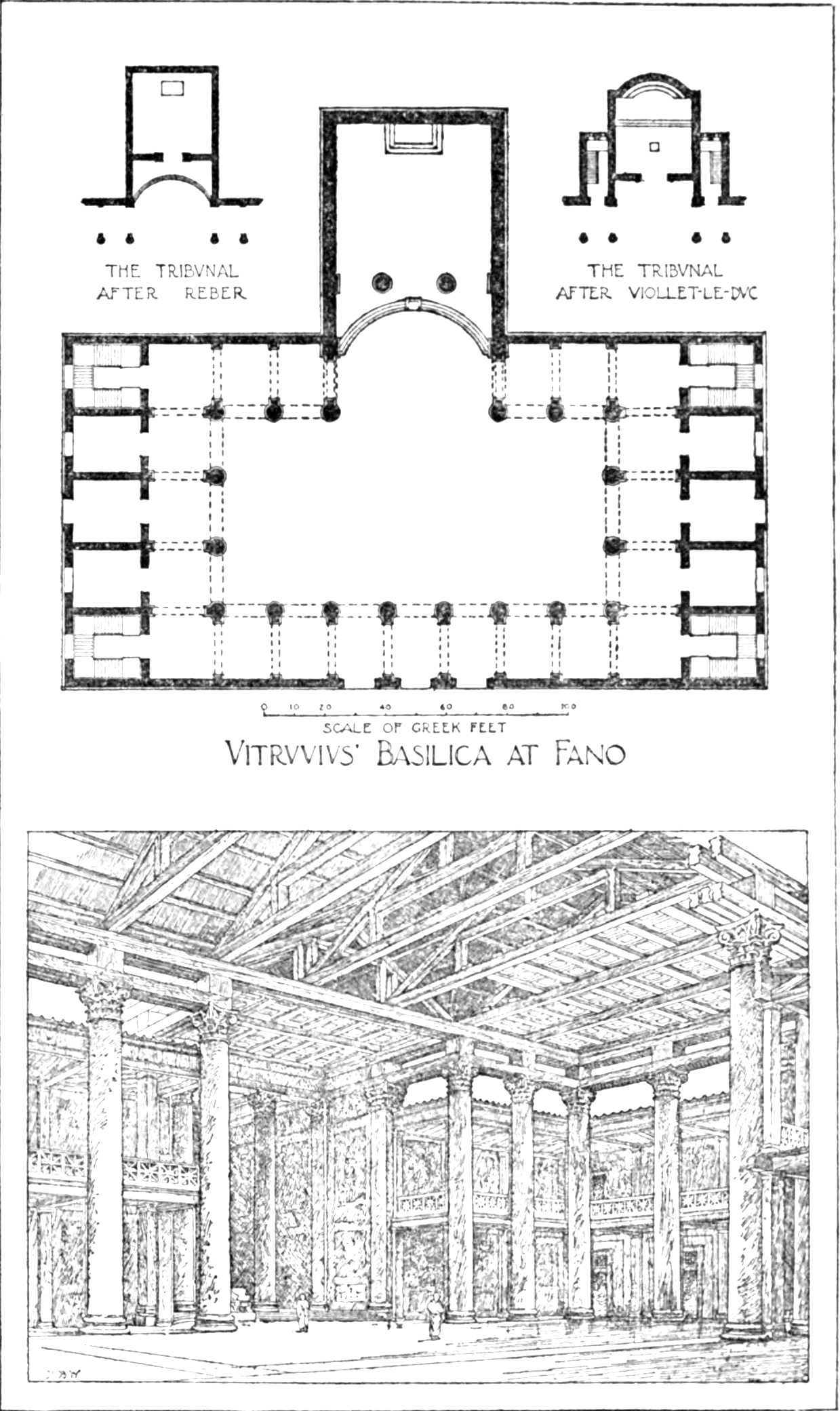
Vitruvius designed and supervised the construction of this basilica in Fano (reconstruction).

Vitruvius is the first Roman architect whose work has survived into modern times. He himself cites older but less complete works. De Architectura is more of a codification of existing architectural practice than an original work. Roman architects practised a wide variety of disciplines; in modern terms they would also be described as landscape architects, civil engineers, military engineers, structural engineers, surveyors, artists, and craftsmen combined.

In Book I, Chapter 1, titled "The Education of the Architect", Vitruvius instructs:

Architecture is a science arising out of many other sciences, and adorned with much and varied learning; by the help of which a judgment is formed of those works which are the result of other arts. Practice and theory are its parents. Practice is the frequent and continued contemplation of the mode of executing any given work, or of the mere operation of the hands, for the conversion of the material in the best and readiest way. Theory is the result of that reasoning which demonstrates and explains that the material wrought has been so converted as to answer the end proposed.

Wherefore the mere practical architect is not able to assign sufficient reasons for the forms he adopts; and the theoretic architect also fails, grasping the shadow instead of the substance. He who is theoretic as well as practical, is therefore doubly armed; able not only to prove the propriety of his design, but equally so to carry it into execution.

He goes on to write that the architect should be versed in drawing, geometry, optics (lighting), history, philosophy, music, theatre, medicine, and law.

In Book I, Chapter 3 (The Departments of Architecture), Vitruvius divides architecture into three branches, namely: building; the construction of sundials and water clocks; and the design and use of machines in construction and warfare. He further divides building into public and private. Public building includes city planning, public security structures such as walls, gates and towers; the convenient placing of public facilities such as theatres, forums and markets, baths, roads and pavings; and the construction and position of shrines and temples for religious use. Later books are devoted to the understanding, design and construction of each of these.

=== Proportions of man ===
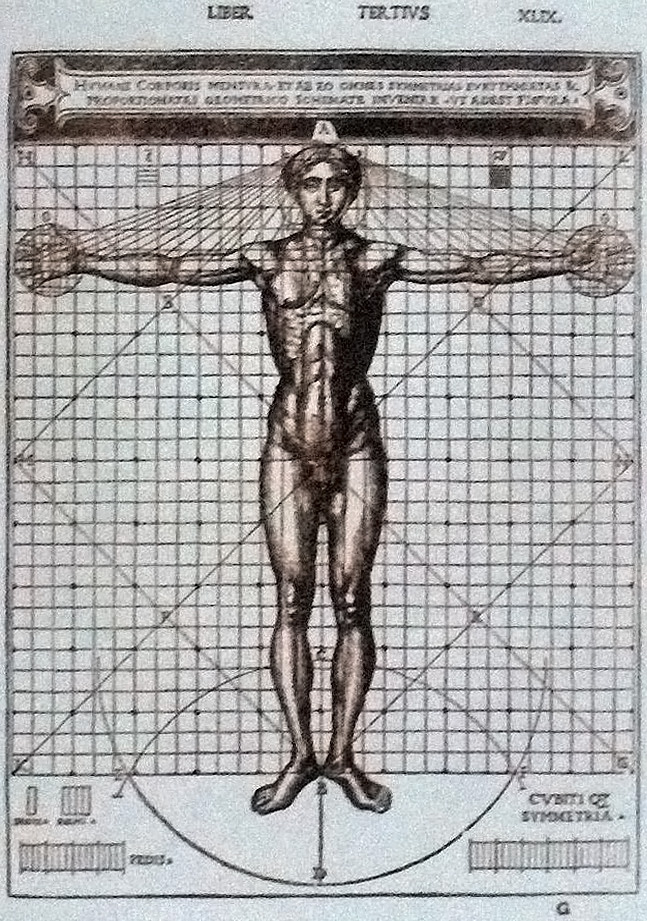
"Vitruvian Man", illustration in the edition of De architectura by Vitruvius; illustrated edition by Cesare Cesariano (1521).

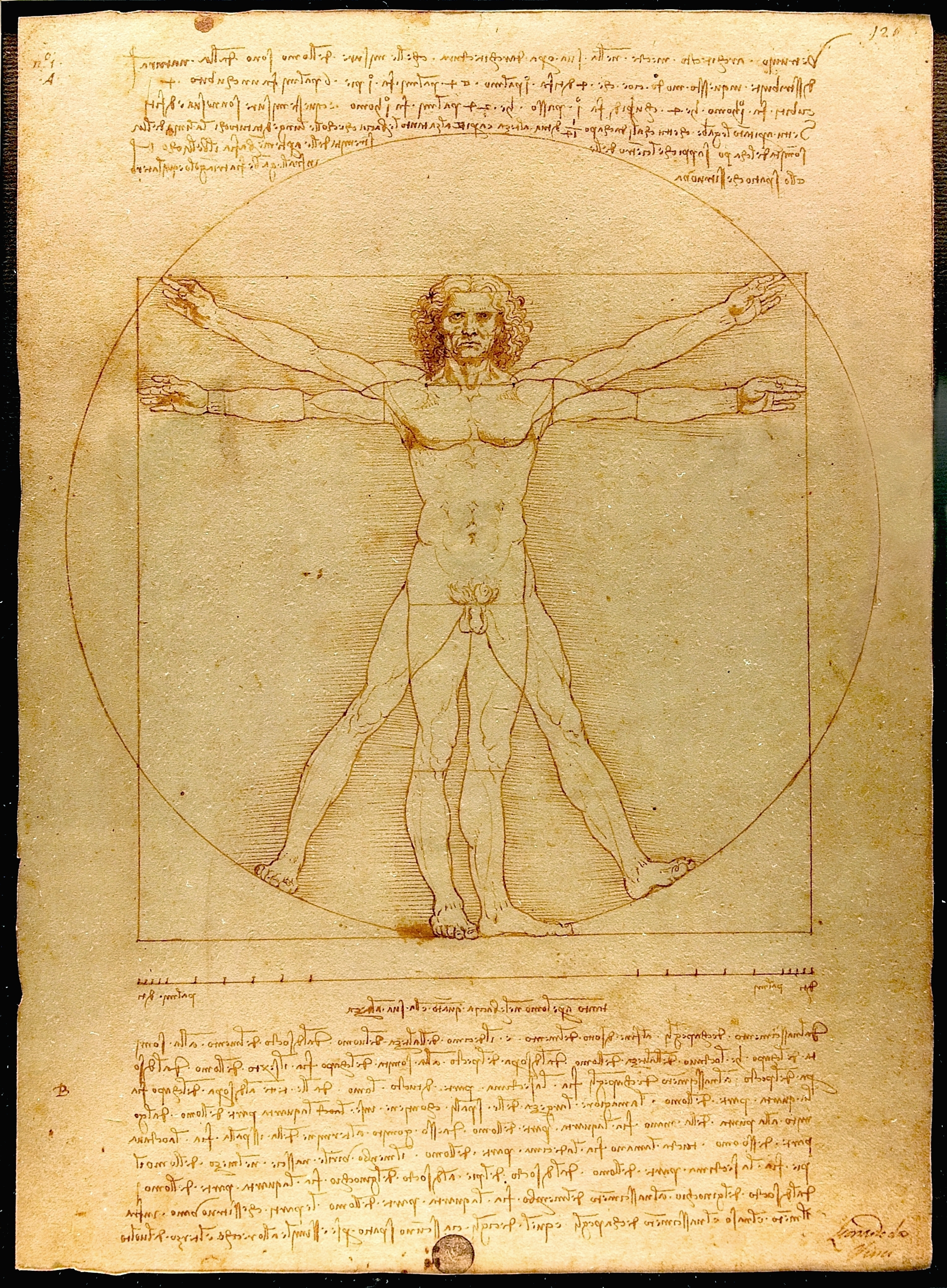
Vitruvian Man by Leonardo da Vinci, an illustration of the human body inscribed in the circle and the square derived from a passage about geometry and human proportions in Vitruvius' writings

In Book III, Chapter 1, Paragraph 3, Vitruvius writes about the proportions of man:

Just so the parts of Temples should correspond with each other, and with the whole. The navel is naturally placed in the centre of the human body, and, if in a man lying with his face upward, and his hands and feet extended, from his navel as the centre, a circle be described, it will touch his fingers and toes. It is not alone by a circle, that the human body is thus circumscribed, as may be seen by placing it within a square. For measuring from the feet to the crown of the head, and then across the arms fully extended, we find the latter measure equal to the former; so that lines at right angles to each other, enclosing the figure, will form a square.

It was upon these writings that Renaissance engineers, architects and artists like Mariano di Jacopo Taccola, Pellegrino Prisciani and Francesco di Giorgio Martini and finally Leonardo da Vinci based the illustration of the Vitruvian Man.

The drawing itself is often used as an implied symbol of the essential symmetry of the human body, and by extension, of the universe as a whole.

=== Lists of names given in Book VII Introduction ===
In the introduction to book seven, Vitruvius names those whom he considered to be the most talented individuals in history. Vitruvius remarks that many of these people are unknown, while many of those of lesser talent but greater political position are famous.. He predicts that some of these individuals will be forgotten and their works lost, while other political characters he deems less deserving will be forever remembered.

- List of physicists: Thales, Democritus, Anaxagoras, Xenophanes
- List of philosophers: Socrates, Plato, Aristotle, Zeno, Epicurus
- List of kings: Croesus, Alexander the Great, Darius
- On plagiarism: Aristophanes, Ptolemy I Soter, a person named Attalus
- On abusing dead authors: Zoilus Homeromastix, Ptolemy II Philadelphus
- On divergence of the visual rays: Agatharchus, Aeschylus, Democritus, Anaxagoras
- List of writers on temples: Silenus, Theodorus, Chersiphron and Metagenes, Ictinus and Carpion, Theodorus the Phocian, Hermogenes, Arcesius, Satyrus and a person named Pytheos
- List of artists: Leochares, Bryaxis, Scopas, Praxiteles, Timotheos
- List of writers on laws of symmetry: Nexaris, Theocydes, a person named Demophilus, Pollis, a person named Leonidas, Silanion, Melampus, Sarnacus, Euphranor
- List of writers on machinery: Diades of Pella, Archytas, Archimedes, Ctesibius, Nymphodorus, Philo of Byzantium, Diphilus, Democles, Charias, Polyidus of Thessaly, Pyrrus, Agesistratus
- List of writers on architecture: Fuficius, Terentius Varro, Publius Septimius (writer)
- List of architects: Antistates, Callaeschrus, Antimachides, Porinus, Cossutius
- List of greatest temple architects: Chersiphron of Gnosus, Metagenes, Demetrius, Paeonius the Milesian, Ephesian Daphnis, Ictinus, Philo, Cossutius, Gaius Mucianus

=== Rediscovery ===
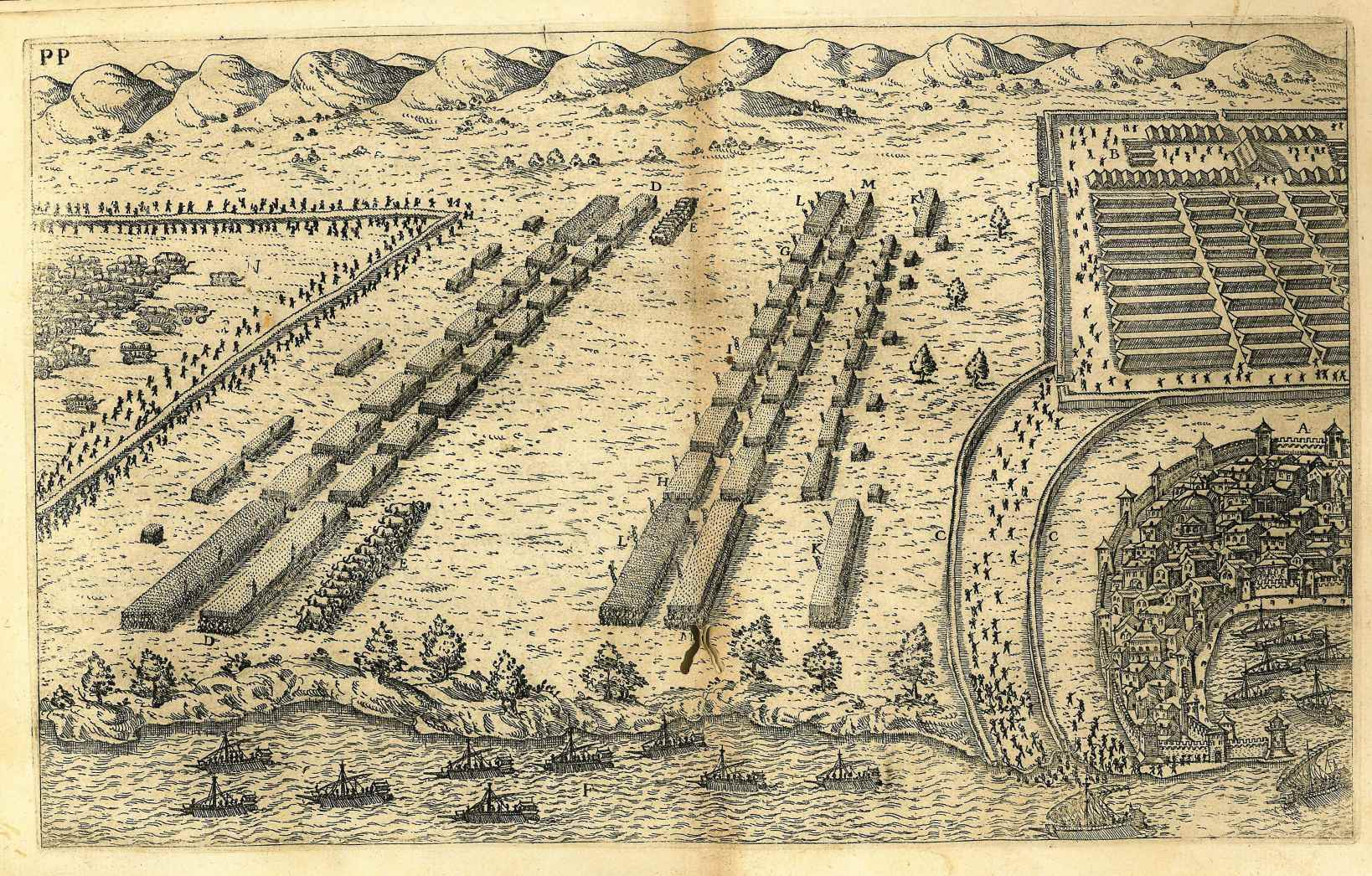
Battle of Thapsus as depicted in an engraving after Andrea Palladio

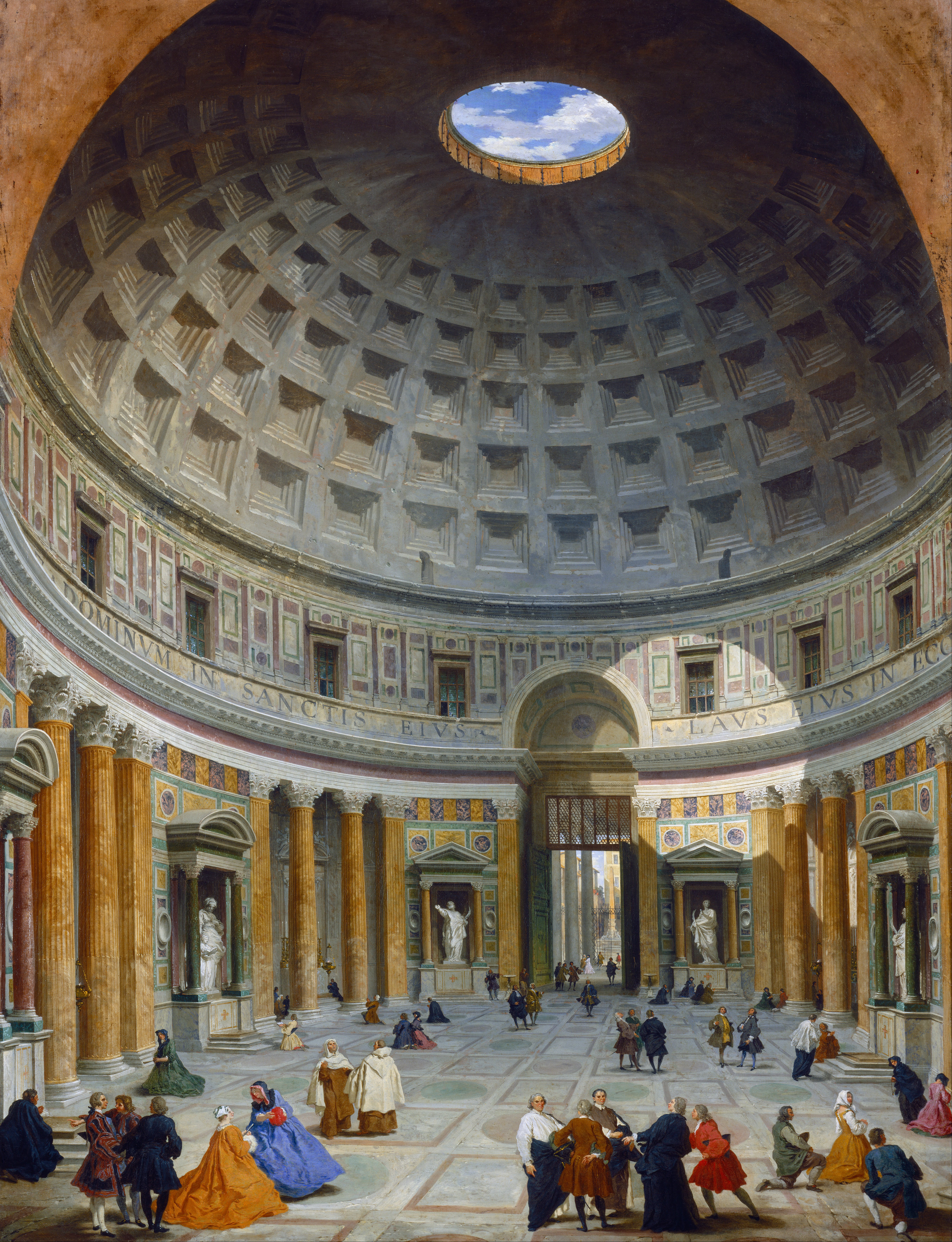
The interior of the Pantheon (from an 18th-century painting by Panini). Although built after Vitruvius' death, its excellent state of preservation makes it of great importance to those interested in Vitruvian architecture

Vitruvius' De architectura was "rediscovered" in 1414 by the Florentine humanist Poggio Bracciolini in the library of Saint Gall Abbey. Leon Battista Alberti (1404–1472) publicised it in his seminal treatise on architecture, De re aedificatoria (c. 1450). The first known Latin printed edition was by Fra Giovanni Sulpitius in Rome, 1486. Translations followed in Italian (Cesare Cesariano, 1521), French (Jean Martin, 1547), English, German (Walther H. Ryff, 1543) and Spanish and several other languages. The original illustrations had been lost and the first illustrated edition was published in Venice in 1511 by Fra Giovanni Giocondo, with woodcut illustrations based on descriptions in the text.

In 1542 the Accademia della Virtù was formed in Rome under the patronage of Marcello Cervini to prepare a new annotated edition of De architectura. They met twice a week to read and discuss Vitruvius in the context of ancient monuments.

Later in the 16th-century Andrea Palladio provided illustrations for Daniele Barbaro's commentary on Vitruvius, published in Italian and Latin versions. The most famous illustration is probably Da Vinci's Vitruvian Man.

The surviving ruins of Roman antiquity, the Roman Forum, temples, theatres, triumphal arches and their reliefs and statues offered visual examples of the descriptions in the Vitruvian text. Printed and illustrated editions of De Architectura inspired Renaissance, Baroque and Neoclassical architecture. Filippo Brunelleschi, for example, invented a new type of hoist to lift the large stones for the dome of the cathedral in Florence and was inspired by De Architectura as well as surviving Roman monuments such as the Pantheon and the Baths of Diocletian.

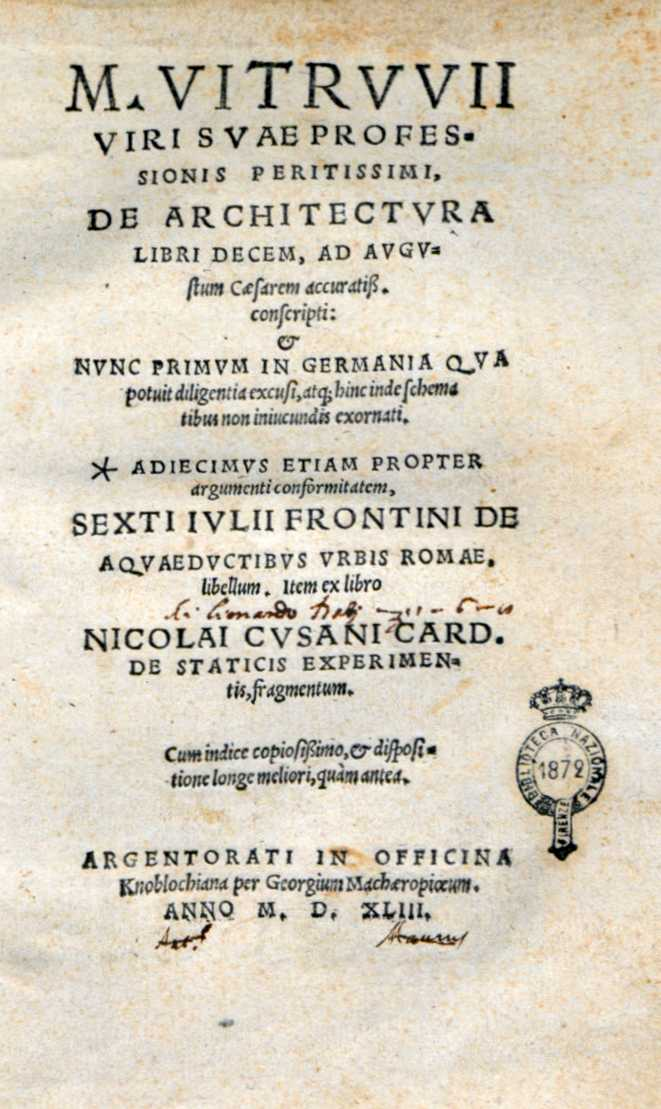
De architectura, 1543

== Archaeological discovery of the basilica ==
On 19 January 2026, during archaeological excavations in the coastal town of Fano, the remains of the civic basilica described by Vitruvius in his treatise De architectura were discovered. The find was confirmed at a press conference at the Mediateca Montanari and is direct evidence of the work of the Roman architect.

== Roman technology ==
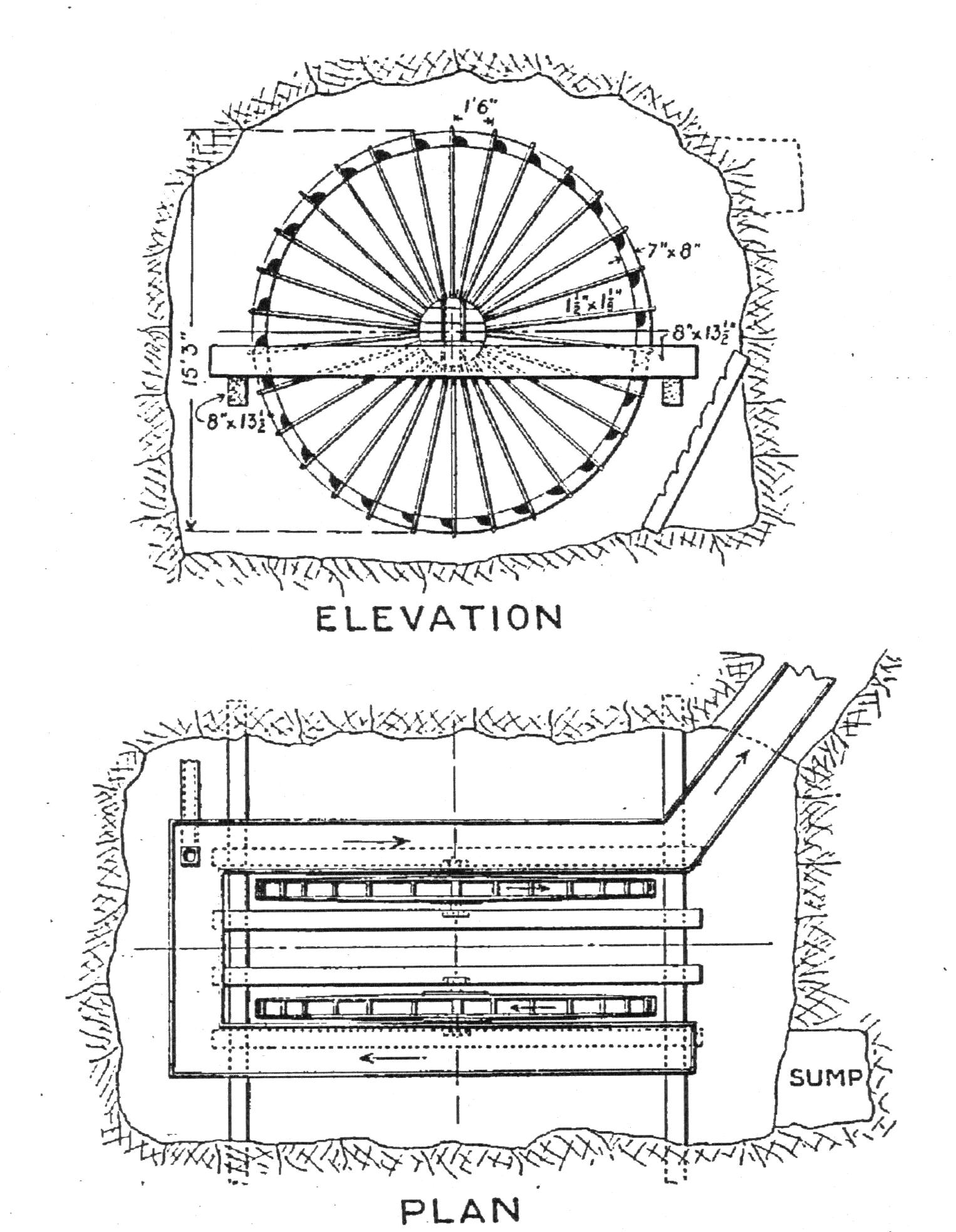
Drainage wheel from Rio Tinto mines

Books VIII, IX and X form the basis of much of what we know about Roman technology, now augmented by archaeological studies of extant remains, such as the water mills at Barbegal in France. The other major source of information is the Naturalis Historia compiled by Pliny the Elder in c. 75 AD.

=== Machines ===
The work is important for its descriptions of the many different machines used for engineering structures such as hoists, cranes and pulleys, as well as war machines such as catapults, ballistae, and siege engines. He also describes the construction of sundials and water clocks, and the use of an aeolipile (the first steam engine) as an experiment to demonstrate the nature of atmospheric air movements (wind).

=== Aqueducts ===
His description of aqueduct construction includes the way they are surveyed, and the careful choice of materials needed. The use of the inverted siphon is described in detail, together with the problems of high pressures developed in the pipe at the base of the siphon, a practical problem with which he seems to be acquainted. Frontinus, a general who was appointed in the late 1st century AD to administer the many aqueducts of Rome, is another surviving source on Roman aqueduct construction methods, although he lived a century after Vitruvius.

=== Materials ===
He describes many different construction materials used for a wide variety of different structures, as well as such details as stucco painting. Concrete and lime receive in-depth descriptions.

Vitruvius is one of the earliest sources to connect lead mining, manufacture, and lead water pipes, with adverse effects on health. For this reason, he recommended the use of clay pipes and masonry channels in the provision of piped drinking-water.

Vitruvius is the source for the anecdote that credits Archimedes with the discovery of the mass-to-volume ratio while relaxing in his bath. Having been asked to investigate the suspected adulteration of the gold used to make a crown, Archimedes realised that the crown's volume could be measured exactly by its displacement of water, and ran into the street with the cry of Eureka!

=== Dewatering machines ===
He describes the construction of Archimedes' screw in Chapter X (without mentioning Archimedes by name). It was a device widely used for raising water to irrigate fields and drain mines. Other lifting machines he mentions include the endless chain of buckets and the reverse overshot water-wheel. Remains of the water wheels used for lifting water were discovered when old mines were re-opened at Rio Tinto in Spain, Rosia Montana in Romania and Dolaucothi in west Wales. The Rio Tinto wheel is now shown in the British Museum, and the Dolaucothi specimen in the National Museum of Wales.

=== Surveying instruments ===
Vitruvius provides descriptions of a variety of surveying instruments, especially the water level or chorobates, which he compares favourably with the groma, a device using plumb lines. They were essential in all building operations, but especially in aqueduct construction, where a uniform gradient was important to the provision of a regular supply of water without damage to the walls of the channel. He also describes an first odometers, consisting of a wheel of known circumference that dropped a pebble into a container on every rotation.

=== Central heating ===
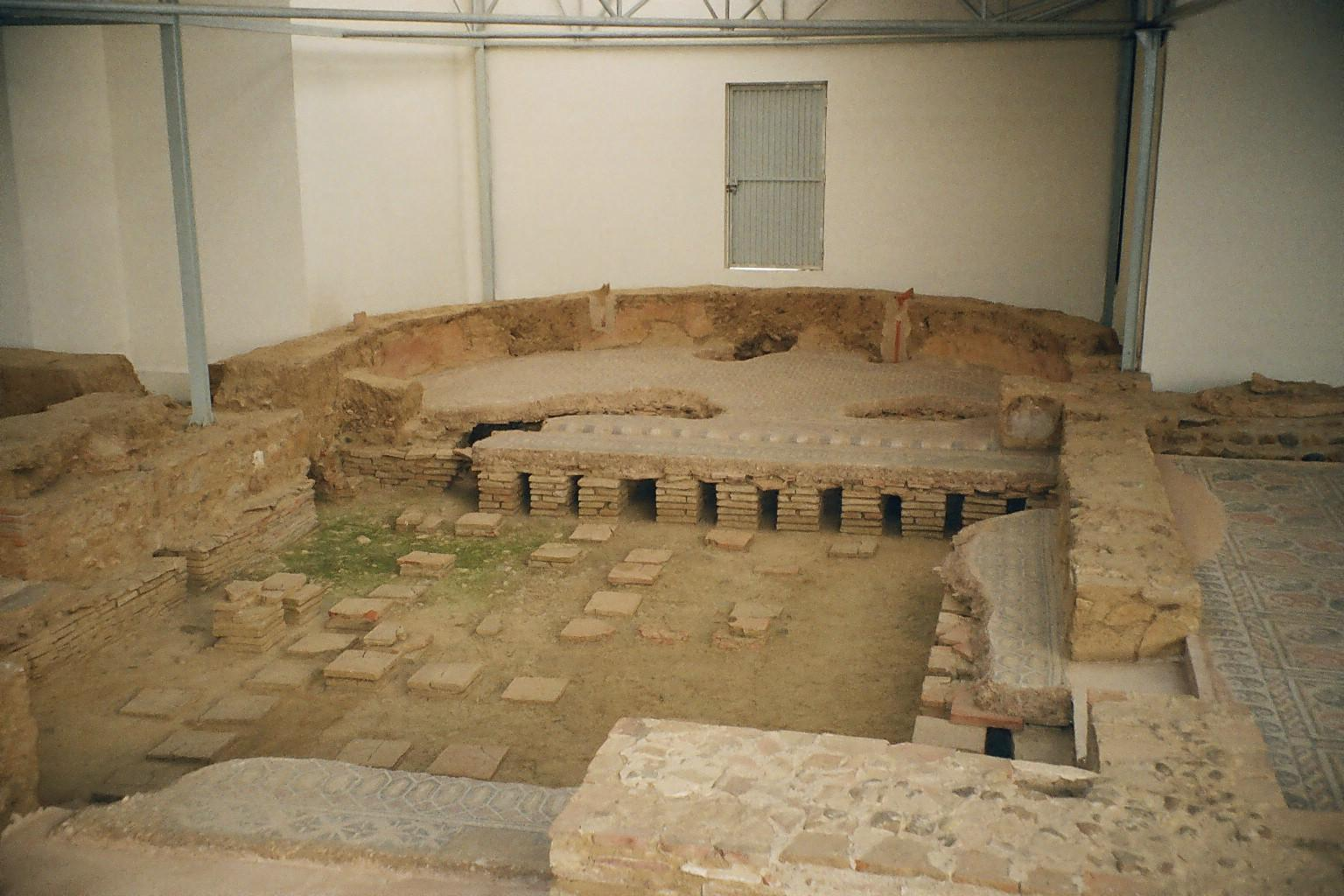
Ruins of the hypocaust under the floor of a Roman villa. The part under the exedra is covered.

He describes how to build a hypocaust, a type of central heating where hot air developed by a fire was channelled under the floor and inside the walls of public baths and villas. He explains how to design such buildings so that fuel efficiency is maximised, so that for example, the caldarium is next to the tepidarium followed by the frigidarium. He also advises on using a type of regulator to control the heat in the hot rooms, a bronze disc set into the roof under a circular aperture which could be raised or lowered by a pulley to adjust the ventilation. In later centuries, similar devices such as the reverse overshot water-wheel were used in the larger baths to lift water to header tanks at the top of the larger thermae, such as the Baths of Diocletian.

== Legacy ==
- Vitruvian Man – a drawing by Leonardo da Vinci
- Vitruvius Britannicus – 18th century work on British architecture named after Vitruvius.
- Den Danske Vitruvius – 18th century work on Danish architecture – inspired by Vitruvius Britannicus.
- The American Vitruvius – 20th century work on civil architecture by Werner Hegemann
- William Vitruvius Morrison (1794–1838), the son of Irish architect Sir Richard Morrison and himself a noted architect of great houses, bridges, court houses and prisons.
- A small lunar crater has been named after Vitruvius and also an elongated lunar mountain Mons Vitruvius close by.
- The Design Quality Indicator (DQI) tool for buildings uses Vitruvius's principles.

== See also ==
- Aristotle
- Ctesibius
- Colen Campbell
- Frontinus
- Pliny the Elder
- Roman architecture
- Roman aqueducts
- Roman engineering
- Roman technology
- Vitruvian Man
- Vitruvian scroll
- Lucius Vitruvius Cordo

== Sources ==
- Indra Kagis McEwen, Vitruvius: Writing the Body of Architecture. Cambridge, MA: MIT Press, 2004. ISBN 0-262-63306-X
- B. Baldwin, "The Date, Identity, and Career of Vitruvius". In Latomus 49 (1990), 425–34.
- Kai Brodersen & Christiane Brodersen: Cetius Faventinus. Das römische Eigenheim / De architectura privata, Latin and German. Wiesbaden: Marix 2015, ISBN 978-3-7374-0998-8
