= Scoedia gens =

Ancient Roman family

The gens Scoedia was an obscure plebeian family at ancient Rome. Members of this gens are known entirely from inscriptions dating to the early Empire. Gaius Scoedius Natta Pinarianus obtained the consulship under Titus.

== Origin ==
The Scoedii may have been of Umbrian origin, as nearly all of the inscriptions of this family are from Umbria or neighboring parts of Cisalpine Gaul.

== Branches and cognomina ==
The surname Natta, referring to a fuller, was inherited from the ancient Pinaria gens, from whom the consul Scoedius must have been descended, based on his agnomen, Pinarianus. Such connections may account for his rise to the consulship from an otherwise obscure family.

== Members ==
This list includes abbreviated praenomina. For an explanation of this practice, see filiation.

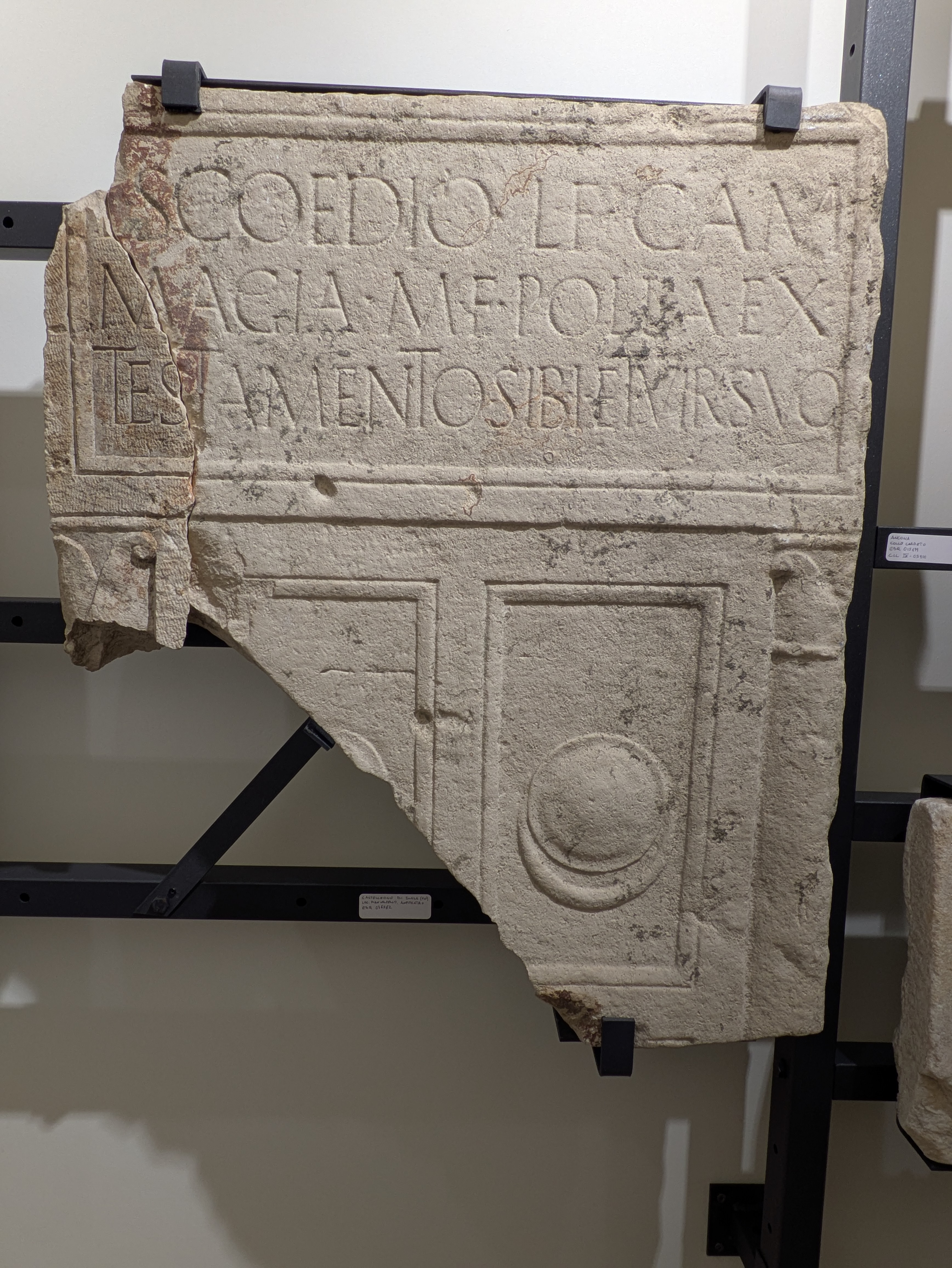
Monument of Lucius Scoedius and Magia Polla

- Lucius Scoedius L. f., buried at Suasa in Umbria during the Augustan period, with a tomb dedicated by his wife, Magia Polla.
- Gaius Scoedius Natta Pinarianus, consul suffectus in AD 81, serving from the Kalends of July to the Kalends of August, during the brief reign of Titus.
- Scoedia, named in an inscription from Forum Popilii in Cisalpine Gaul.
- Scoedia Herois, dedicated a late first-century tomb at Rome to her husband, Marcus Spedius Magnus.
- Scoedia M. l. Prisca, a freedwoman named in an inscription from Forum Popilii.
- Marcus Scoedius M. l. Rufio, a freedman named in an inscription from Forum Popilii.

== See also ==
- List of Roman gentes

== Bibliography ==
- Theodor Mommsen et alii, Corpus Inscriptionum Latinarum (The Body of Latin Inscriptions, abbreviated CIL), Berlin-Brandenburgische Akademie der Wissenschaften (1853–present).
- René Cagnat et alii, L'Année épigraphique (The Year in Epigraphy, abbreviated AE), Presses Universitaires de France (1888–present).
- Paul A. Gallivan, "The Fasti for A.D. 70–96", in Classical Quarterly, vol. 31, pp. 186–220 (1981).
