= Propertia gens =

Minor plebeian family at ancient Rome

The gens Propertia was a minor plebeian family at ancient Rome. Few members of this gens are mentioned in history, and none of them ever obtained the consulship, but a few of them held other magistracies in imperial times. The most famous of the Propertii was Sextus Propertius, a celebrated poet of the Augustan age. Many other Propertii are known from inscriptions.

== Origin ==
The poet Propertius wrote that he was born in Umbria, near the border with Etruria. The Propertii were homines novi, a family just beginning to make its mark in Roman society, and modern scholars suppose that they were probably of Umbrian extraction. An Umbrian inscription from Asisium mentions a certain Nerie Propartie, or "Nerius Propertius".

== Members ==
This list includes abbreviated praenomina. For an explanation of this practice, see filiation.

- Nerius Propertius, named in an inscription from Asisium, dating to the end of the second century BC, or the beginning of the first.
- Titus Propertius, grandfather of Gaius Propertius Postumus, the proconsul.
- Quintus Propertius T. f., father of the proconsul Gaius Propertius Postumus.
- Quintus Propertius Q. f. (T. n.), probably the elder brother of Gaius Propertius Postumus, named in the same sepulchral inscription from Rome.
- Gaius Propertius Q. f. T. n. Postumus, held a number of magistracies, including those of quaestor, praetor, and proconsul of an uncertain province during the time of Augustus.
- Sextus Propertius, the poet, variously known as Sextus Aurelius Propertius, or Sextus Propertius Nauta, was born in Umbria about the middle of the first century BC, and wrote his elegies between about 31 and 16 BC.
- Propertius Celer, had been praetor, but in AD 15, he asked to be degraded in the hopes of being relieved of the financial burdens of his rank. The emperor Tiberius instead sent him a million sestertii in order to maintain his household.

== See also ==
- List of Roman gentes

== Bibliography ==
- Publius Cornelius Tacitus, Annales.
- Dictionary of Greek and Roman Biography and Mythology, William Smith, ed., Little, Brown and Company, Boston (1849).
- Theodor Mommsen et alii, Corpus Inscriptionum Latinarum (The Body of Latin Inscriptions, abbreviated CIL), Berlin-Brandenburgische Akademie der Wissenschaften (1853–present).
- George Davis Chase, "The Origin of Roman Praenomina", in Harvard Studies in Classical Philology, vol. VIII (1897).
- Paul von Rohden, Elimar Klebs, & Hermann Dessau, Prosopographia Imperii Romani (The Prosopography of the Roman Empire, abbreviated PIR), Berlin (1898).
