= Pythis =

Pythis may refer to:

- an alternative name for Pythius of Priene, a Greek architect of the 4th century BCE
- Pythis (weevil), a beetle genus in the tribe Polydrusini
