= Demophilus =

Demophilus (Ancient Greek: Δημόφιλος) may refer to:

- Demophilus of Thespiae led a contingent of about 700 Thespians at the Battle of Thermopylae (480 BC), and was killed there
- Demophilus, an ancient Greek artist from Sicily
- Demophilus (historian) edited the first universal history which was written by his father Ephorus
- Demophilus of Constantinople, bishop of Constantinople from 370 until expelled in 380
