= Fuficius (architect) =

Fuficius is an author mentioned by Vitruvius in his work De architectura. According to Vitruvius, he published the first Roman book on architecture. It has been suggested that he is synonymous with the Roman general Quintus Fufius Calenus.
