= Rustia gens =

Roman family

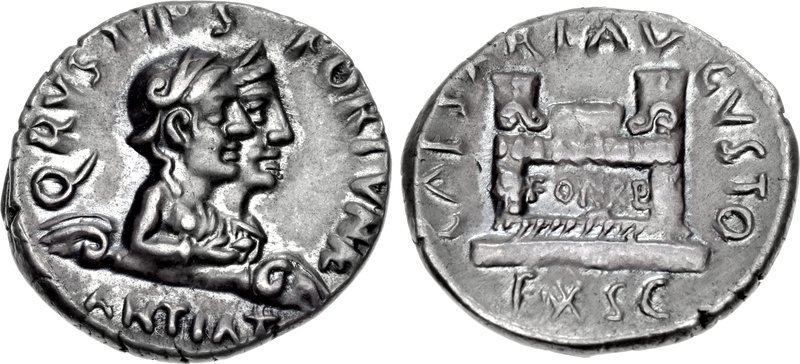
Denarius of Quintus Rustius, 19 BC. The obverse depicts heads of Fortuna Victrix and Fortuna Felix, resting on a bar terminating in rams' heads. The reverse depicts an altar.

The gens Rustia was a minor plebeian family at ancient Rome. Members of this gens are first mentioned toward the end of the Republic, and a few of them achieved prominence in imperial times, with Titus Rustius Nummius Gallus attaining the consulship under Tiberius in AD 34.

== Origin ==
The nomen Rustius seems to belong to a class of gentilicia of Umbrian derivation., and one of the Rustii held high office at Interamnia Nahars in Umbria. The nomen Rusius, found in a handful of authors and inscriptions, may be an error for Rustius, as may Ruscius, although the latter may have been a variant of Roscius.

== Praenomina ==
The main praenomina of the Rustii were Lucius and Titus, both of which were among the most common names throughout Roman history. There are also instances of Gaius, Marcus and Quintus, also very common names.

== Branches and cognomina ==
The only distinct family of the Rustii bore the surname Caepio, from caepa, an onion, one of a large class of cognomina derived from the names of familiar objects, plants, and animals. Members of this family appear in history for about two hundred years, from the first century BC to the second century AD. Gallus, used by one of the family, referred either to a cockerel, or a Gaul.

== Members ==
This list includes abbreviated praenomina. For an explanation of this practice, see filiation.

- Gaius Rusius, a noted prosecutor mentioned by Cicero. In Brutus, Cicero has Atticus relate an anecdote in which the erudite Rusius harangued his opponent, Lucius Cornelius Sisenna, for his colourful and novel expressions, giving as an example Sisenna's description of Rusius' charges as sputatilica, "worthy to be spit upon".
- Lucius Rustius, as triumvir monetalis in 76 BC, minted denarii depicting the head of Minerva on the obverse, and a ram on the reverse.
- Rustius, an officer who served under Marcus Licinius Crassus during his expedition against the Parthians.
- Lucius Rustius L. f. L. n. Caepio, a pontifex, and one of the municipal quattuorviri at Interamnia Nahars in Umbria, according to two inscriptions dating to the latter part of the first century BC.
- Quintus Rustius M. f., triumvir monetalis in 19 BC, was one of the duumvirs at Antium.
- Titus Rustius Nummius Gallus, consul suffectus in AD 34.
- Rustius Caepio, left a legacy for his heir to pay to newly appointed senators, which Domitian annulled early in his reign.
- Titus Rustius Caepio, consul suffectus circa AD 173.

== See also ==
- List of Roman gentes

== Bibliography ==
- Marcus Tullius Cicero, Brutus.
- Lucius Mestrius Plutarchus (Plutarch), Lives of the Noble Greeks and Romans.
- Gaius Suetonius Tranquillus, De Vita Caesarum (Lives of the Caesars, or The Twelve Caesars).
- Lucius Cassius Dio Cocceianus (Cassius Dio), Roman History.
- Joseph Hilarius Eckhel, Doctrina Numorum Veterum (The Study of Ancient Coins, 1792–1798).
- Dictionary of Greek and Roman Biography and Mythology, William Smith, ed., Little, Brown and Company, Boston (1849).
- Theodor Mommsen et alii, Corpus Inscriptionum Latinarum (The Body of Latin Inscriptions, abbreviated CIL), Berlin-Brandenburgische Akademie der Wissenschaften (1853–present).
- George Davis Chase, "The Origin of Roman Praenomina", in Harvard Studies in Classical Philology, vol. VIII, pp. 103–184 (1897).
- Paul von Rohden, Elimar Klebs, & Hermann Dessau, Prosopographia Imperii Romani (The Prosopography of the Roman Empire, abbreviated PIR), Berlin (1898).
- Michael Crawford, Roman Republican Coinage, Cambridge University Press (1974, 2001).
- Géza Alföldy, Konsulat und Senatorenstand unter der Antonien (The Consulate and Senatorial State under the Antonines), Rudolf Habelt, Bonn (1977).
- John C. Traupman, The New College Latin & English Dictionary, Bantam Books, New York (1995).
