= List of siege engines =

This is a list of siege engines invented through history. A siege engine is a weapon used to circumvent or destroy fortifications such as defensive walls, castles, bunkers and fortified gateways. Petrary is the generic term for medieval stone throwing siege engines.

== By age, oldest to newest ==
Name	Image	Date	Location	Notes
Siege tower		9th Century BC	Assyria	
Battering ram		9th Century BC	Assyria	First siege engine recorded to be used, soon adopted by Sparta.
Catapult		500 BC	Greece	A signature siege engine, used until World War I.
Lithobolos		5th Century BC	Magadha	Siege engines that propel a stone along a flat track with two rigid bow arms powered by torsion. Invented by the Kingdom of Magadha.
Siege ladder		6th Century BC	China	Consists of attacking soldiers advancing to the base of a wall, setting ladders, and climbing to engage the defending forces.
Assault cover			China	Protective covers were used in sieges. The most typical were mobile screens and assault wagons. More complex contraptions such as plaited galleries were used for mining and filling in moats.
Watchtower cart			China	Static observation towers such as the nest and watchtower carts were used to see into the city. Static towers were also used in close proximity to enemy walls to rain down projectiles on the defenders.
Ballista		400 BC	Syracuse, Sicily	A very large and powerful crossbow. Could be mounted on carts. Similar weapons mounted on elephants were used by the Khmer Empire.
Onager		353 BC	Rome	The Onager was a Roman torsion powered siege engine. It is commonly depicted as a catapult with a bowl, bucket, or sling at the end of its throwing arm.
Trebuchet		4th Century BC	China	Similar to the catapult, but uses a swinging arm to launch projectiles. It is usually considered to be stronger than the catapult.
Oxybeles		375 BC	Greece	An oversized gastraphetes, a composite bow placed on a stand with a stock and a trigger.
Helepolis		305 BC	Rhodes	Greek siege tower first used in Rhodes.
Polybolos		289 BC	Greece	A siege engine with torsion mechanism, drawing its power from twisted sinew-bundles.
Sambuca		213 BC	Sicily	Roman seaborne siege engine build on two ships.
Siege hook		189 BC	Rome	A siege hook is a weapon used to pull stones from a wall during a siege. The method used was to penetrate the protective wall with the hook and then retract it, pulling away some of the wall with it.
Scorpio		52 BC	Rome	Similar to the ballista, but smaller. Was sometimes mounted on a mule-drawn cart.
Harpax		36 BC	Rome	A catapult-shot grapnel created by Marcus Vipsanius Agrippa for use against Sextus Pompey during the naval battles of the Sicilian Revolt.
Carroballista		101 AD	Rome	A handheld siege engine which shot bolts that were smaller than those in other forms of ballistae and generally made of metal.
Catapulta			Rome	A Roman siege engine for throwing arrows and javelins. The name comes from the Greek katapeltes because it could pierce or 'go through' (kata) shields (peltas). The catapulta was made of wood and were placed on stands.
Mangonel		6th Century AD	China	A type of trebuchet which uses traction.
Springald		11th century	Byzantium	An inward shooting piece of siege equipment.
Artillery		First seen in the 14th century, only called artillery around the 15th and 16th centuries	China	After the invention of gunpowder in China, the ability to create firearms and siege artillery was open, siege technology advanced from here but, under the artillery category. There is fewer use for this kind of technology today after the invention of rockets and high grade explosives.
