= Greek and Roman artillery =

Artillery for shooting large arrows, bolts or spherical stones or metal balls

The Greeks and Romans both made extensive use of artillery for shooting large arrows, bolts or spherical stones or metal balls. Occasionally they also used ranged early thermal weapons. There was heavy siege artillery, but more mobile and lighter field artillery was already known and used in pitched battles, especially in Roman imperial period.

The technology was developed quite rapidly, from the earliest gastraphetes in about 399 BC to the most advanced torsion artillery in about 300 BC at the time of Demetrius Polyiorcetes. No improvement, except in details, was ever made upon the catapults of Demetrius. The Romans obtained their knowledge from the Greeks, and employed the Greek specialists.

Five Greek and Roman sources have survived: two treatises by Heron of Alexandria, Belopoeika and Cheiroballistra; and the books by Biton of Pergamon, Philo of Byzantium and Vitruvius

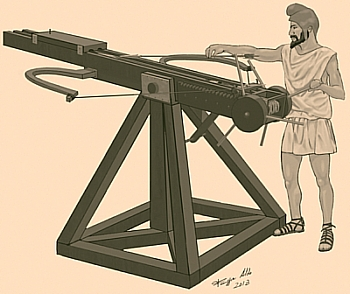
Greek non-torsion siege crossbow (gastraphetes)

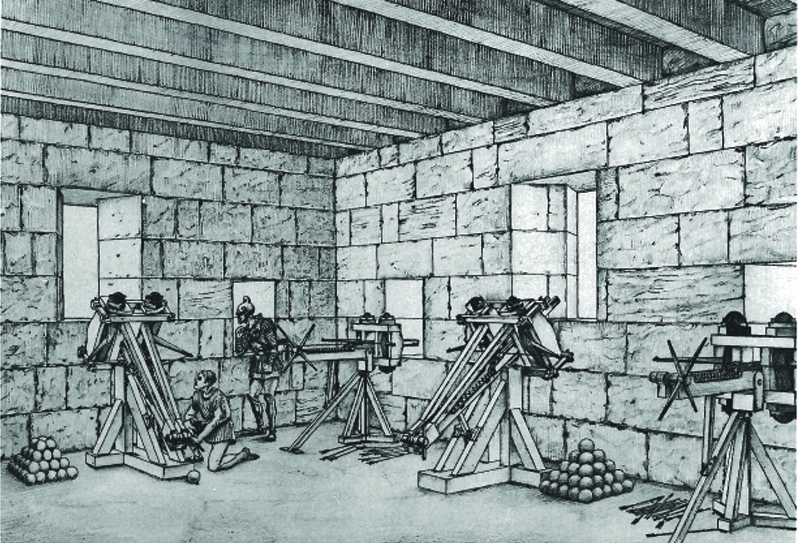
Hellenistic era artillery tower with arrow shooters (euthytona) and stone throwers (palintona)

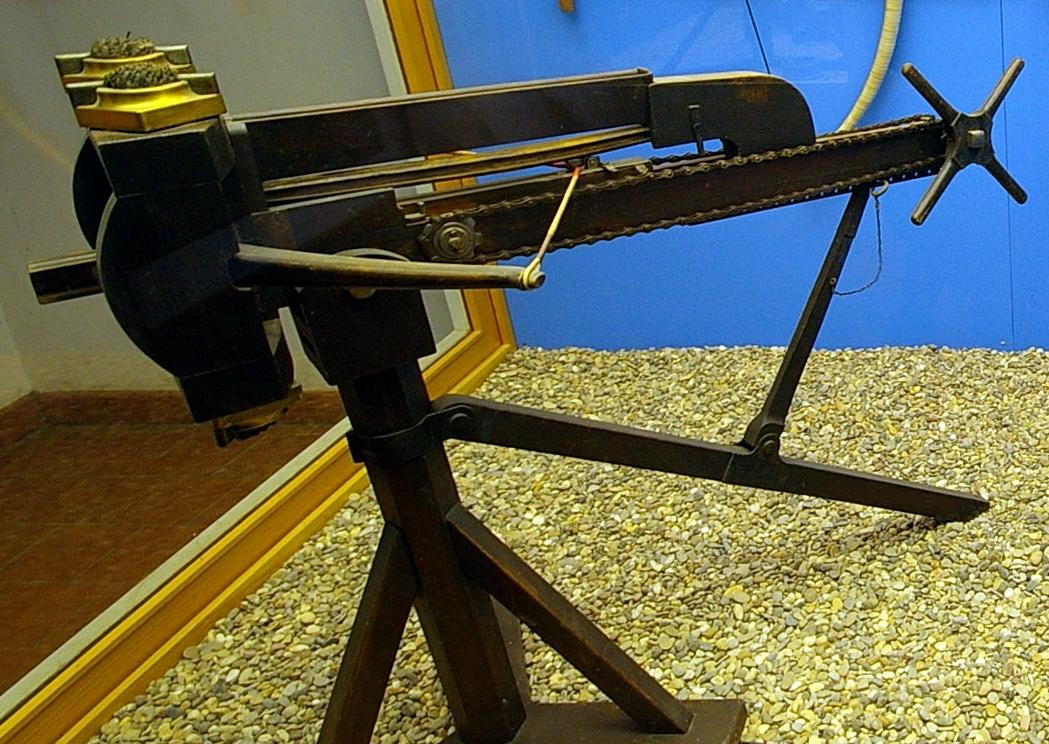
Hellenistic era semi-automatic bolt shooter (polybolos)

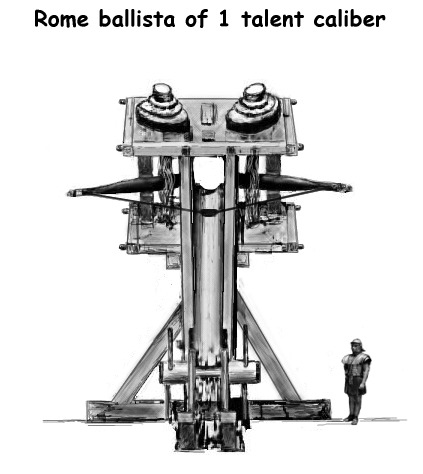
Roman imperial era 1-talent (75-pounder) ballista used in siege warfare

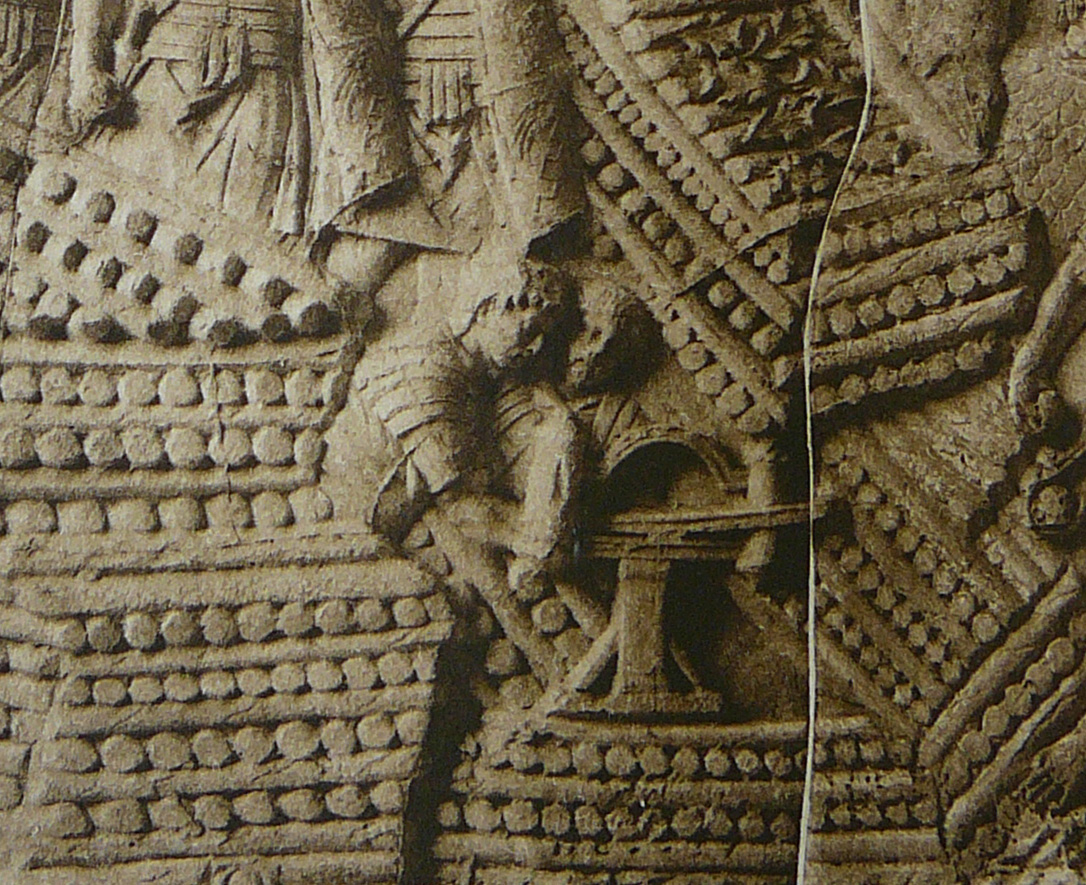
Roman imperial era bolt shooter (scorpio) bastion in defensive warfare

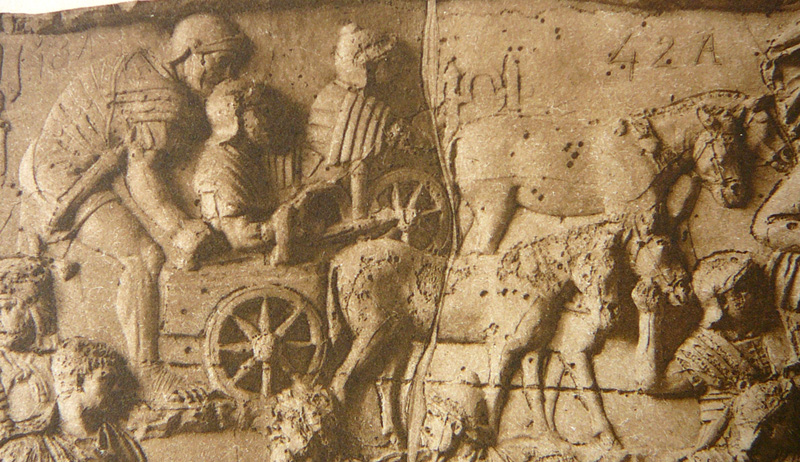
Roman imperial era mobile field artillery (carroballistae)

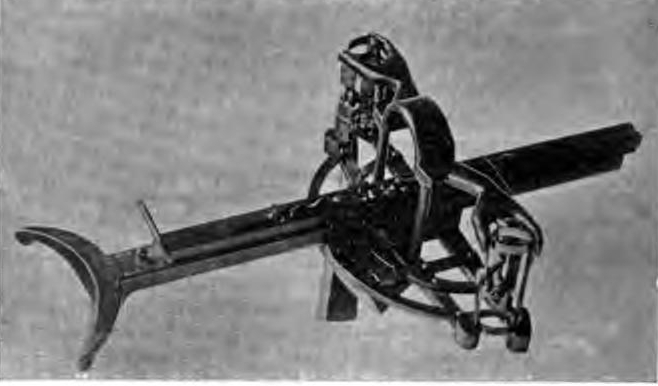
Handheld Roman imperial era manuballista or cheiroballistra

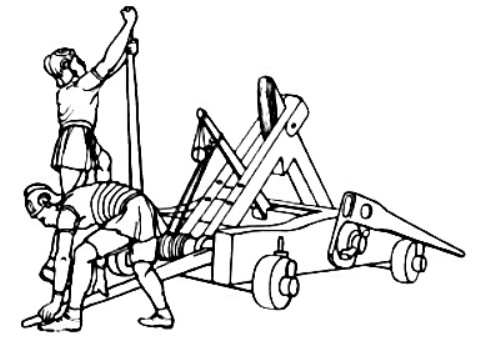
Late Roman era stone thrower (onager) used predominantly in sieges

== Energy storage ==
The earliest artillery pieces, like gastraphetes, were driven by large composite bows. According to Marsden's analysis of ancient sources, they were invented in Syracuse in 399 BC, when tyrant Dionysius I gathered there an assembly of expert craftsmen to conduct a research on new armament. Diodorus XIV.41.3, says that these were the first catapults, and describes the impression new weapons made during the siege of Motya by Dionysius.

Torsion siege engine pieces were probably invented in Macedonia, shortly before the times of Alexander III. These were driven by the torsion of a spring made of an appropriate organic material, usually sinew or hair, human or horse. Stone-throwing torsion-powered machines had their first recorded use in 332 BC at the siege of Tyre by Alexander.

Although other power systems such as metal springs and pneumatically powered machines were experimented with by Ctesibius – according to Philo – there is no record of their actual use. Metal springs were not sufficiently resilient at that time, and both the traction and counterweight trebuchet were unknown to the Greeks and Romans.

== Nomenclature ==
The names of the artillery pieces changed with time. Though all inventions in the field of artillery were made by the Greeks, the best known are the Latin names, catapulta and ballista.

Originally, catapulta (καταπέλτης ὀξυβελής) meant an arrow- or bolt-throwing engine, and a ballista (καταπελτης λιτοβολος or πετροβολος) was a more powerful machine primarily designed for throwing stones. At some time between 100 CE and 300 CE a change occurred in the nomenclature. Thus, in the 4th century CE catapulta indicates a one-armed stone-throwing engine, also known as onager, while ballista means a two-armed piece which shoots bolts only.

The authors of Greek treatises classified artillery pieces into two categories: euthytones and palintones. Hero writes that euthytones were arrow-throwing, while palintones usually stone throwing, but sometimes could also shoot arrows or both. The precise meaning of these terms is disputed. According to Schramm, Marsden and their followers, this distinction reflects the difference in the shape of the detail of the frame which is called "hole carrier". According to the so-called "French school", the arms of a euthytone extended outside the frame, while the arms of a palintone moved inside the frame. The problem arises because the ancient descriptions that we have do not contain original pictures, and the meaning of certain technical terms is unclear.

== Dimensions, materials and performance ==
Much research was done by Hellenistic Greek scientists and craftsmen on the design of artillery pieces. The main parameter that determines the sizes of all parts of the machine is the weight of the projectile or the length of the bolt (arrow). The fundamental size characteristic is called the hole diameter; it is the same as the diameter of the spring (which is a bunch of sinew rope). Vitruvius gives the following formulas for the hole diameter: it is the length of the bolt divided by 9 for the bolt-throwing machines, or : $1.1 (100W)^{1/3},$ for the stone-throwing machines, where W is the weight of the projectile in Attic minas (1 mina = 436.6 grams (15.40 oz)), and the hole diameter is measured in dactyls (1 dactyl = 19.3 millimetres (0.76 in)). Then the dimensions of all parts are defined as fixed multiples of the hole diameter, for example the length of the arm is 7 hole diameters.

Most of the frame detail were made in the Hellenistic period of wood. Hero of Alexandria proposed metal frame and metal cylinders to enclose the springs. Depictions on Trajan's Column and archaeological evidence indicate that these metal artillery pieces were widely used by the Romans. An important detail, washer used in the stretching of the spring was always made of metal, and these washers are the only pieces of Hellenistic artillery, besides the stone balls and arrowheads which are found by archaeologists. The preferred material for the springs was sinew and human hair. Horse hair was considered an inferior substitute. In 250 BC, Rhodes sent to Sinope for her war with Mitridates about 3/4 of a ton of women's hair. In 225 BC Seleucus gave Rhodes a present of hair weighing 1000 talents. This gift was a part of international relief program after a catastrophic earthquake. This shows that a large trade in human hair existed in Hellenistic period.

A typical ballista could throw a stone weighing 1 talent (60 minae = 26.2 kilograms (58 lb))) at the distance of 400 yd (370 m). There existed heavy ballistae able to throw stones weighing 3 talents and more. Much longer ranges were claimed by Athenaeus Mechanicus "...a three-span catapult shot 700 yd (640 m) (three and half stades); its springs weighted twelve minae. A four-cubit palintone engine shot 800 yd (730 m) (four stades)".

Athenaeus of Naucratis mentions a catapulte designed by Archimedes, which could throw a three talent stone at the distance of one stade. This catapult was installed on a ship. Polybius (VIII,7,9) writes that catapults used to defend Syracuse during the siege by Marcellus were throwing stones of 10 talents (262 kilograms (578 lb))). The largest weight of projectiles mentioned in Vitruvius is 460 lb (210 kg).

When describing the siege of Jerusalem by Titus, Josephus writes that "the stone balls that were being hurled weighted one talent and traveled two or more stades (400 yd (370 m))".

Philo of Byzantium writes that the stone walls have to be at least 10 cubits (about 3 m (9.8 ft)) thick to be unaffected by stone-shot.

According to Schramm, the best arrow-throwing catapults could be trusted to hit a man at 100 yd (91 m), so the accuracy was better than of an early 19th-century musket.

== Use ==
The main use of artillery was in the siege of fortified places. The heavy stone-throwing pieces were used to destroy the walls, while the lighter arrow-shooting pieces to clear the walls from the enemy defending them

Sometimes ballistae were used to fire extraordinary projectiles, like pots with snakes, or even parts of dead bodies, with the purpose of terrifying the enemy. For example, the Romans catapulted to the camp of Hannibal the head of his brother Hasdrubal. Artillery was also used as flame carriers. During the last night of Demetrius siege of Rhodes the Rhodians fired 800 cylinders with some incendiary substance; the cylinders being subsequently collected and counted; they managed to set fire on Demetrius' armored tower.

Several attempts to use artillery in the field are recorded but they were mostly unsuccessful, except when the artillery could be deployed in some protected place. For example, in the Battle of Jaxartes Alexander used catapults to clear the further bank of the river.

The artillery pieces were transported in disassembled state, and it took a long time to assemble, install and adjust them. In many cases only a few essential parts of artillery pieces were transported, the rest could be made at the place of a siege if timber was available.

Artillery was used in naval battles, as mentioned in Diodorus, book XX. Both Alexander and Demetrius mounted catapults on ships for the purpose of attacking fortresses.

== Testing modern replicas ==
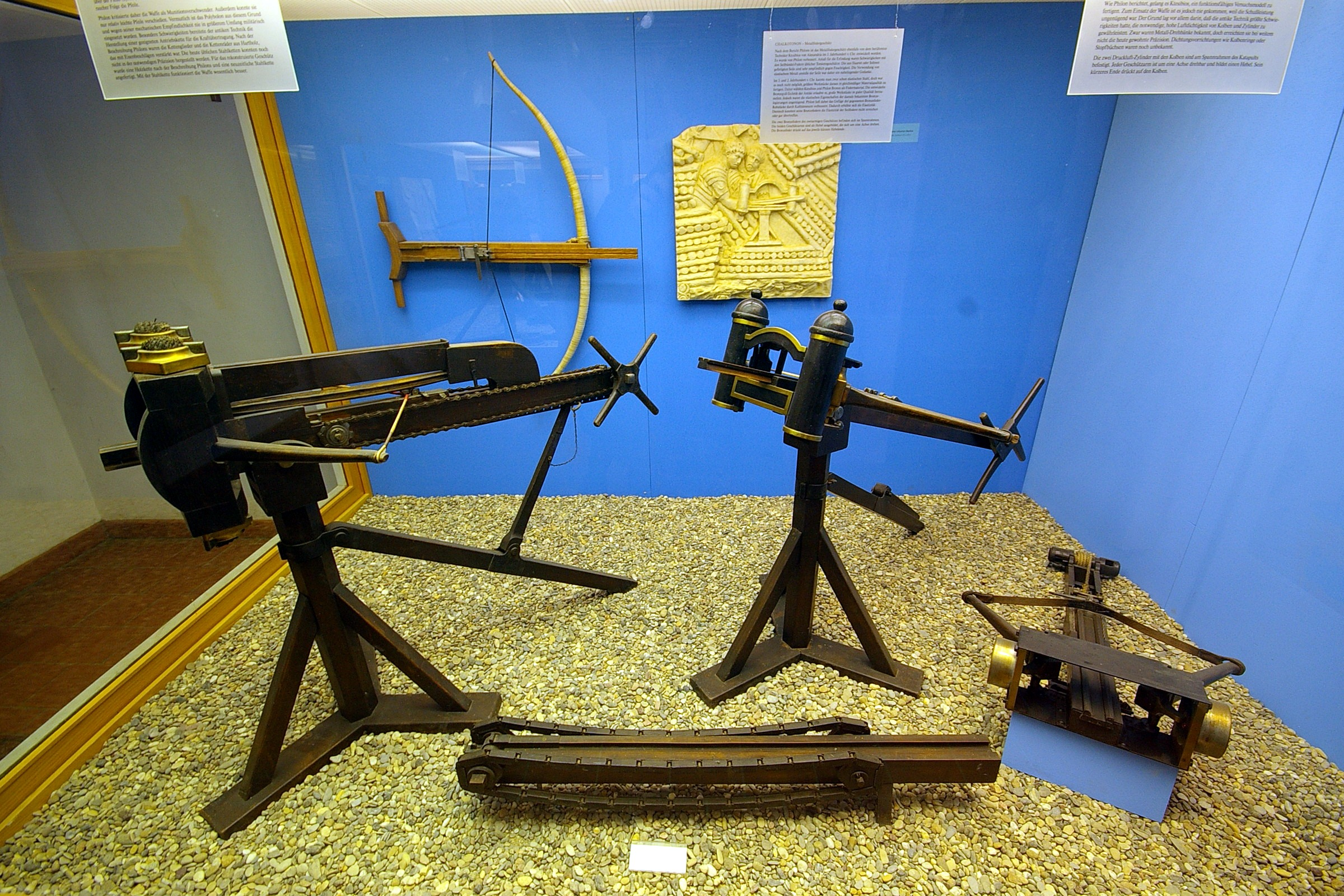
Reproductions of ancient Greek artillery, including catapults such as the polybolos (to the left in the foreground) and a large, early crossbow known as the gastraphetes (mounted on the wall in the background)

Many attempts were made in modern times to reproduce the ancient artillery pieces, following their ancient descriptions, and to test them. The first success was due to German general E. Schramm in collaboration with A. Rehm. They used horse hair for the springs, and achieved the distance of over 300 m (980 ft) with 1 lb (0.45 kg) lead shot, and using another machine, 370 m (1,210 ft) with 1 m (3 ft 3 in) bolt. This bolt penetrated an iron-plated shield 3 cm (1.2 in) thick to half of the bolt's length.

Nowadays many working replicas of various types exist.

== See also ==
- Carroballista
- Cheiroballistra
- Hellenistic armies
- Lithobolos
- Polybolos
- Scorpio (weapon)

== Bibliography ==
- Duncan B. Campbell and Brian Delf, Greek and Roman Artillery 399 BC–AD 363, New Vanguard series 89, Osprey Publishing Ltd., Oxford 2003. ISBN 1 84176 634 8
