= Biton of Pergamon =

Ancient Greek writer

Biton of Pergamon (Greek: Βίτων) was an ancient Greek writer and engineer, who lived in the second or third century BC. Only two of his works are known: a lost book on optics, entitled Optics, and an extant short treatise on siege machines, Construction of War Machines and Catapults (Ancient Greek: Κατασκευαὶ πολεμικῶν ὄργάνων καὶ καταπαλτικῶν).

The military treatise is dedicated to a king named Attalus (Ancient Greek: Ἄτταλος), evidently a king of Pergamon, either Attalus I (241–197) or Attalus II (159–38). Some scholars have suggested, based on internal evidence, that the text should date to 156–55.

Biton describes the construction of four non-torsion catapults. The two built by Charon of Magnesia and by Isidoros of Abydos he calls "stone throwers" (lithoboloi), while the two attributed to Zopyrus of Tarentum are termed gastraphetes. He also describes helepolis (siege tower) built by Poseidonios the Macedonian and the sambuca built by Damis of Kolophon, which was a kind of wheeled scaling ladder. One of the more difficult to understand passages involves a part of the sambuca called the kochlias, which is either a roller or a screw, mounted horizontally or perhaps vertically. To historians, Biton is valuable as the only ancient witness other than Hero of Alexandria to mention non-torsion catapults.

The lost treatise on optics is known only from Biton's references to it in the military treatise. He says that in his optical work he describes a method for calculating the height of walls, which is necessary in order to calculate the proper dimensions for siege engines attacking those walls.
