= Stone thrower =

Stone thrower may refer to:

- Lithobolos
- Stone throwing
