= Siege engine =

Pre-gunpowder machine to attack a fortress

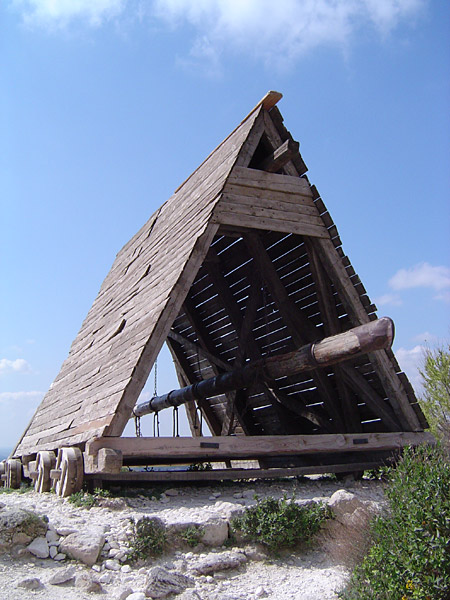
Replica battering ram at Château des Baux, France

A siege engine is a device that is designed to break or circumvent heavy castle doors, thick city walls and other fortifications in siege warfare. Some are immobile, constructed in place to attack enemy fortifications from a distance, while others have wheels to enable advancing up to the enemy fortification. There are many distinct types, such as siege towers that allow foot soldiers to scale walls and attack the defenders, battering rams that damage walls or gates, and large ranged weapons (such as ballistas, catapults/trebuchets and other similar constructions) that attack from a distance by launching heavy projectiles. Some complex siege engines were combinations of these types.

Siege engines are fairly large constructions – from the size of a small house to a large building. From antiquity up to the development of gunpowder, they were made largely of wood, using rope or leather to help bind them, possibly with a few pieces of metal at key stress points. They could launch simple projectiles using natural materials to build up force by tension, torsion, or, in the case of trebuchets, human power or counterweights coupled with mechanical advantage. With the development of gunpowder and improved metallurgy, bombards and later heavy artillery became the primary siege engines.

Collectively, siege engines or artillery together with the necessary soldiers, sappers, ammunition, and transport vehicles to conduct a siege are referred to as a siege train.

== Antiquity ==
=== Ancient Assyria through to the Roman Empire ===
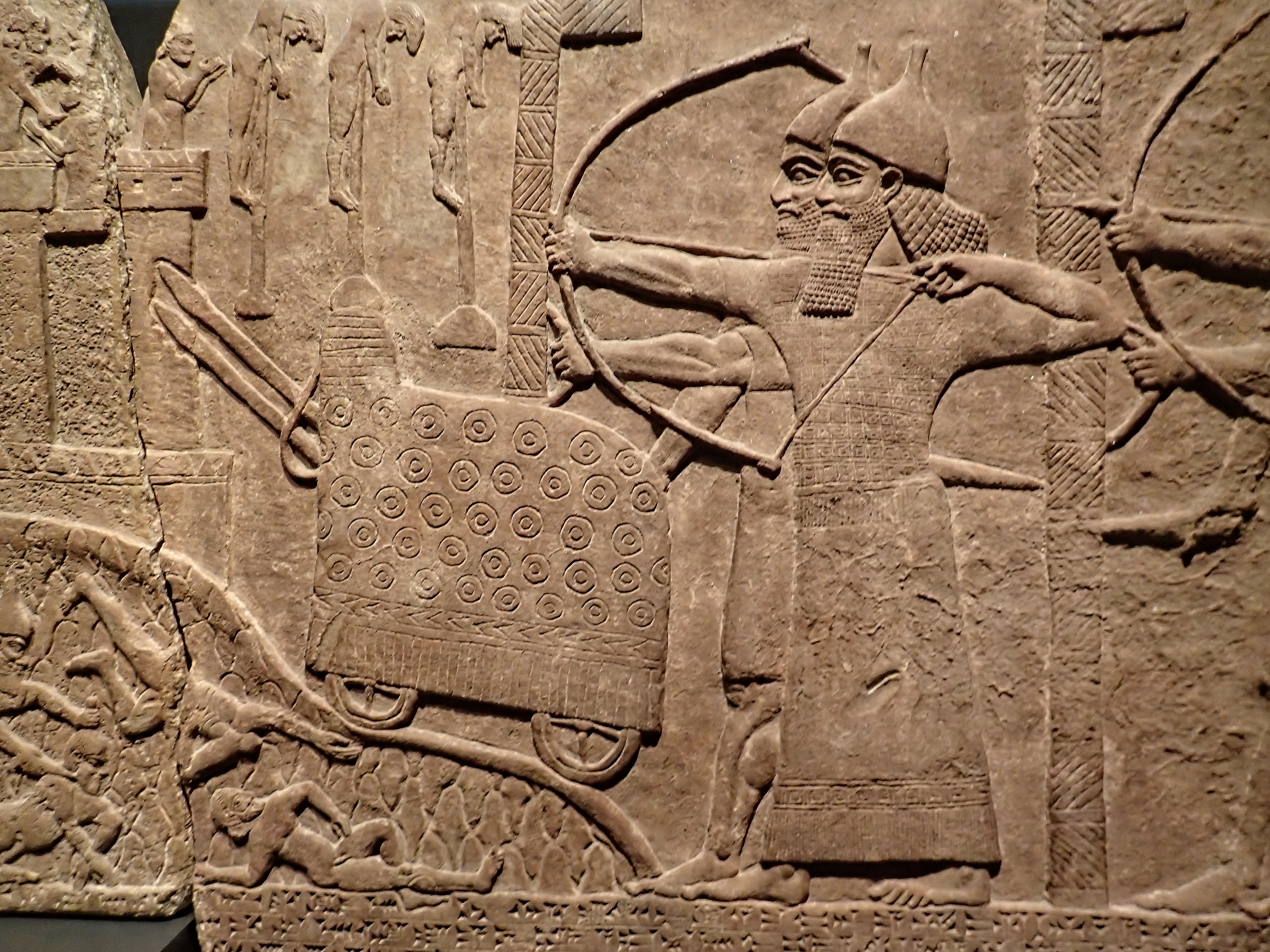
Siege engine in Assyrian relief of attack on an enemy town during the reign of Tiglath-Pileser III 743–720 BC from his palace at Kalhu (Nimrud)

The earliest siege engines appear to be simple movable roofed towers used for cover to advance to the defenders' walls in conjunction with scaling ladders, depicted during the Middle Kingdom of Egypt. Advanced siege engines including battering rams were used by Assyrians, followed by the catapult in ancient Greece. In Kush siege towers as well as battering rams were built from the 8th century BC and employed in Kushite siege warfare, such as the siege of Ashmunein in 715 BC. The Spartans used battering rams in the siege of Plataea in 429 BC, but it seems that the Greeks limited their use of siege engines to assault ladders, though Peloponnesian forces used something resembling flamethrowers.

The first Mediterranean people to use advanced siege machinery were the Carthaginians, who used siege towers and battering rams against the Greek colonies of Sicily. These engines influenced the ruler of Syracuse, Dionysius I, who developed a catapult in 399 BC.

The first two rulers to make use of siege engines to a large extent were Philip II of Macedonia and Alexander the Great. Their large engines spurred an evolution that led to impressive machines, like the Demetrius Poliorcetes' Helepolis (or "Taker of Cities") of 304 BC: nine stories high and plated with iron, it stood 40 m (130 ft) tall and 21 m (69 ft) wide, weighing 180 t (400,000 lb). The most used engines were simple battering rams, or tortoises, propelled in several ingenious ways that allowed the attackers to reach the walls or ditches with a certain degree of safety. For sea sieges or battles, seesaw-like machines (sambykē or sambuca) were used. These were giant ladders, hinged and mounted on a base mechanism and used for transferring marines onto the sea walls of coastal towns. They were normally mounted on two or more ships tied together and some sambuca included shields at the top to protect the climbers from arrows. Other hinged engines were used to catch enemy equipment or even opposing soldiers with opposable appendices which are probably ancestors to the Roman corvus. Other weapons dropped heavy weights on opposing soldiers.

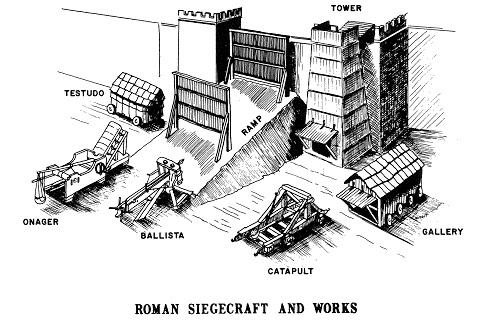
Roman siege engines.

The Romans preferred to assault enemy walls by building earthen ramps (agger) or simply scaling the walls, as in the early siege of the Samnite city of Silvium (306 BC). Soldiers working at the ramps were protected by shelters called vineae, that were arranged to form a long corridor. Convex wicker shields were used to form a screen (plutei or plute in English) to protect the front of the corridor during construction of the ramp. Another Roman siege engine sometimes used resembled the Greek ditch-filling tortoise of Diades, this galley (unlike the ram-tortoise of Hegetor the Byzantium) called a musculus ("muscle") was simply used as cover for sappers to engineer an offensive ditch or earthworks. Battering rams were also widespread. The Roman Legions first used siege towers c. 200 BC; in the first century BC, Julius Caesar accomplished a siege at Uxellodunum in Gaul using a ten-story siege tower. Romans were nearly always successful in besieging a city or fort, due to their persistence, the strength of their forces, their tactics, and their siege engines.

The first documented occurrence of ancient siege engine pieces in Europe was the gastraphetes ("belly-bow"), a kind of large crossbow. These were mounted on wooden frames. Greater machines forced the introduction of pulley system for loading the projectiles, which had extended to include stones also. Later torsion siege engines appeared, based on sinew springs. The onager was the main Roman invention in the field.

=== Ancient China ===
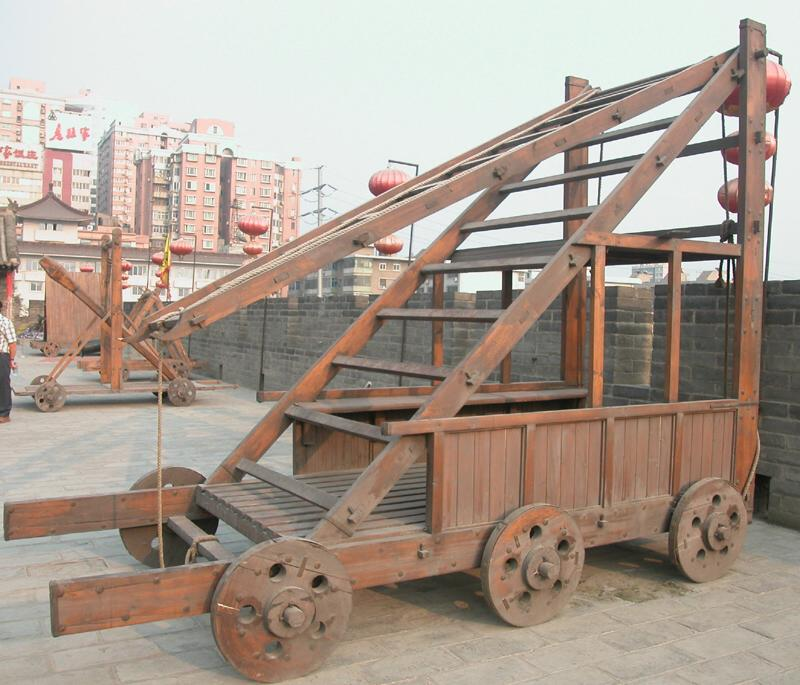
Modern reconstruction of a cloud ladder

The earliest documented occurrence of ancient siege-artillery pieces in China was the levered principled traction catapult and an 8 ft (2.4 m) high siege crossbow from the Mozi (Mo Jing), a Mohist text written at about the 4th – 3rd century BC by followers of Mozi who founded the Mohist school of thought during the late Spring and Autumn period and the early Warring States period. Much of what we now know of the siege technology of the time comes from Books 14 and 15 (Chapters 52 to 71) on Siege Warfare from the Mo Jing. Recorded and preserved on bamboo strips, much of the text is now extremely corrupted. However, despite the heavy fragmentation, Mohist diligence and attention to details which set Mo Jing apart from other works ensured that the highly descriptive details of the workings of mechanical devices like Cloud Ladders, Rotating Arcuballistas and Levered Catapults, records of siege techniques and usage of siege weaponry can still be found today.

=== Elephant ===
Indian, Sri Lankan, Chinese and Southeast Asian kingdoms and empires used war elephants as battering rams.

== Middle Ages ==
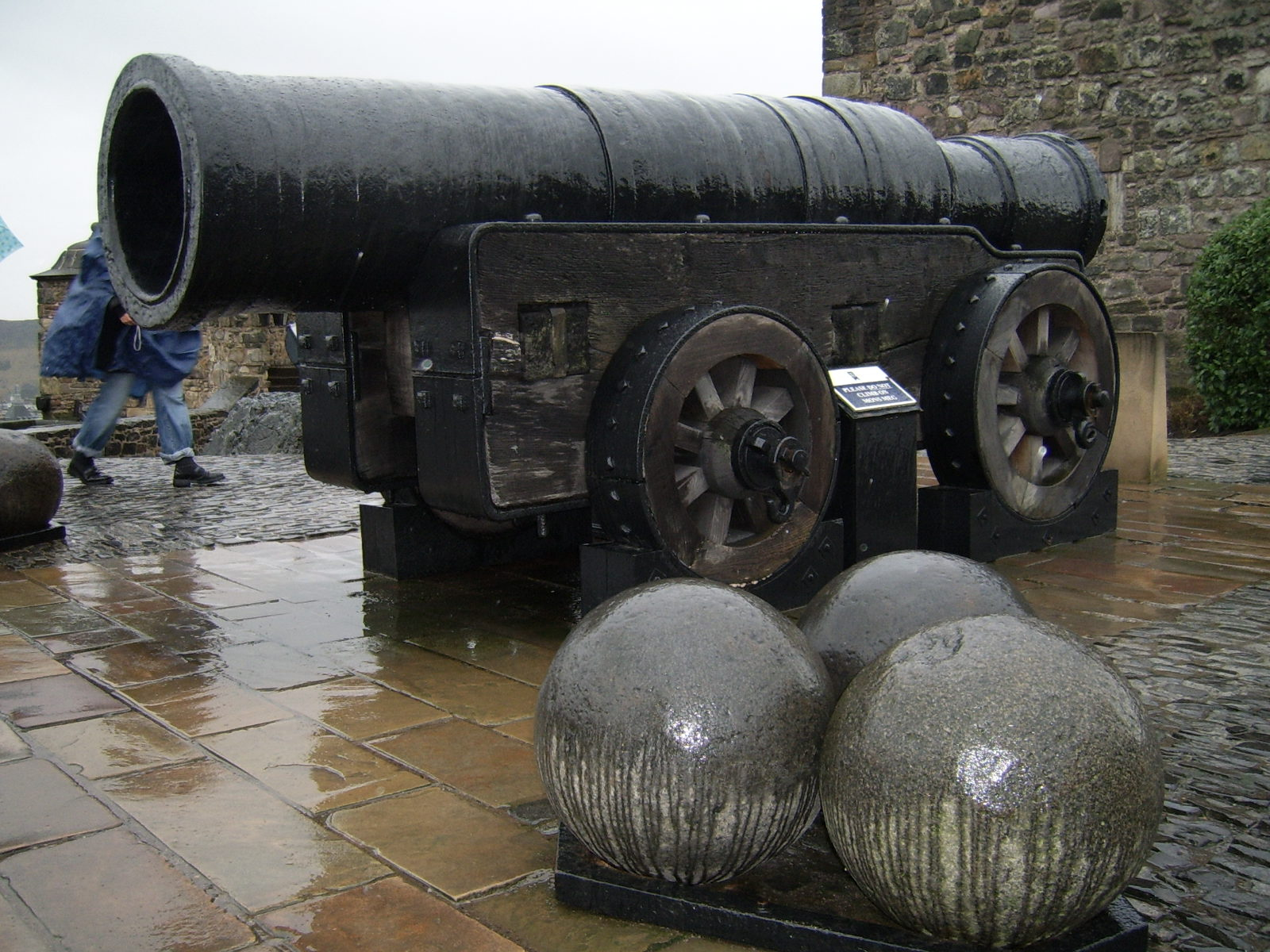
The medieval Mons Meg with its 20" (50 cm) cannonballs

Medieval designs include a large number of catapults such as the mangonel, onager, the ballista, the traction trebuchet (first designed in China in the 3rd century BC and brought over to Europe in the 4th century AD), and the counterweight trebuchet (first described by Mardi bin Ali al-Tarsusi in the 12th century, though of unknown origin). These machines used mechanical energy to fling large projectiles to batter down stone walls. Also used were the battering ram and the siege tower, a wooden tower on wheels that allowed attackers to climb up and over castle walls, while protected somewhat from enemy arrows.

A typical military confrontation in medieval times was for one side to lay siege to an opponent's castle. When properly defended, they had the choice whether to assault the castle directly or to starve the people out by blocking food deliveries, or to employ war machines specifically designed to destroy or circumvent castle defenses. Defending soldiers also used trebuchets and catapults as a defensive advantage.

Other tactics included setting fires against castle walls in an effort to decompose the cement that held together the individual stones so they could be readily knocked over. Another indirect means was the practice of mining, whereby tunnels were dug under the walls to weaken the foundations and destroy them. A third tactic was the catapulting of diseased animals or human corpses over the walls in order to promote disease which would force the defenders to surrender, an early form of biological warfare.

== Modern era ==
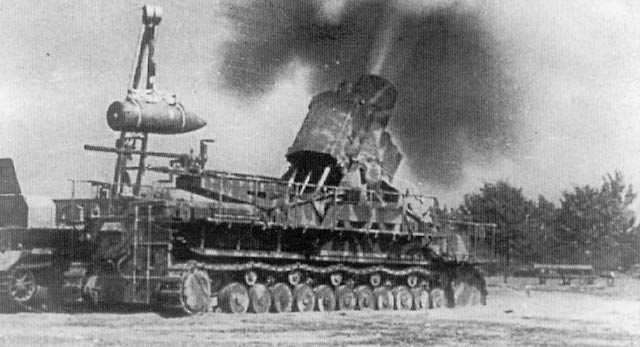
One of the super-heavy Karl-Gerät siege mortars used by the German army in World War II

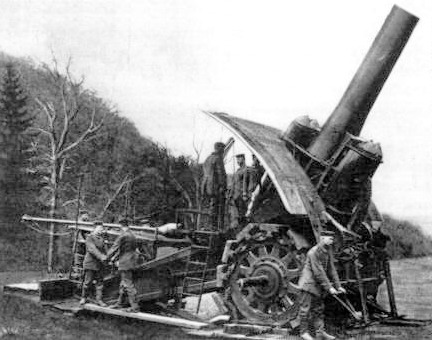
A German Big Bertha howitzer being readied for firing

With the advent of gunpowder, firearms such as the arquebus and cannon—eventually the petard, mortar and artillery—were developed. These weapons proved so effective that fortifications, such as city walls, had to be low and thick, as exemplified by the designs of Vauban.

The development of specialized siege artillery, as distinct from field artillery, culminated during World War I and World War II. During the First World War, huge siege guns such as Big Bertha were designed to see use against the modern fortresses of the day. The apex of siege artillery was reached with the German Schwerer Gustav gun, a huge 80 cm (31 in) caliber railway gun, built during early World War II. Schwerer Gustav was initially intended to be used for breaching the French Maginot Line of fortifications, but was not finished in time and (as a sign of the times) the Maginot Line was circumvented by rapid mechanized forces instead of breached in a head-on assault. The long time it took to deploy and move the modern siege guns made them vulnerable to air attack and it also made them unsuited to the rapid troop movements of modern warfare.

== See also ==
- List of siege engines
- Fortification
- Bunker
- Bunker buster
- Early thermal weapons
- Medieval warfare
- Military engineer
- Military history
- Category:Siege equipment

== Sources ==
- Campbell, Duncan B. (2003). Greek and Roman Siege Machinery 399 BC – AD 363. Osprey Publishing.
- Liang, Jieming (2006). Chinese Siege Warfare: Mechanical Artillery & Siege Weapons of Antiquity. Leong Kit Meng. ISBN 981-05-5380-3.
