= Catapulta =

Machine for throwing arrows and javelins

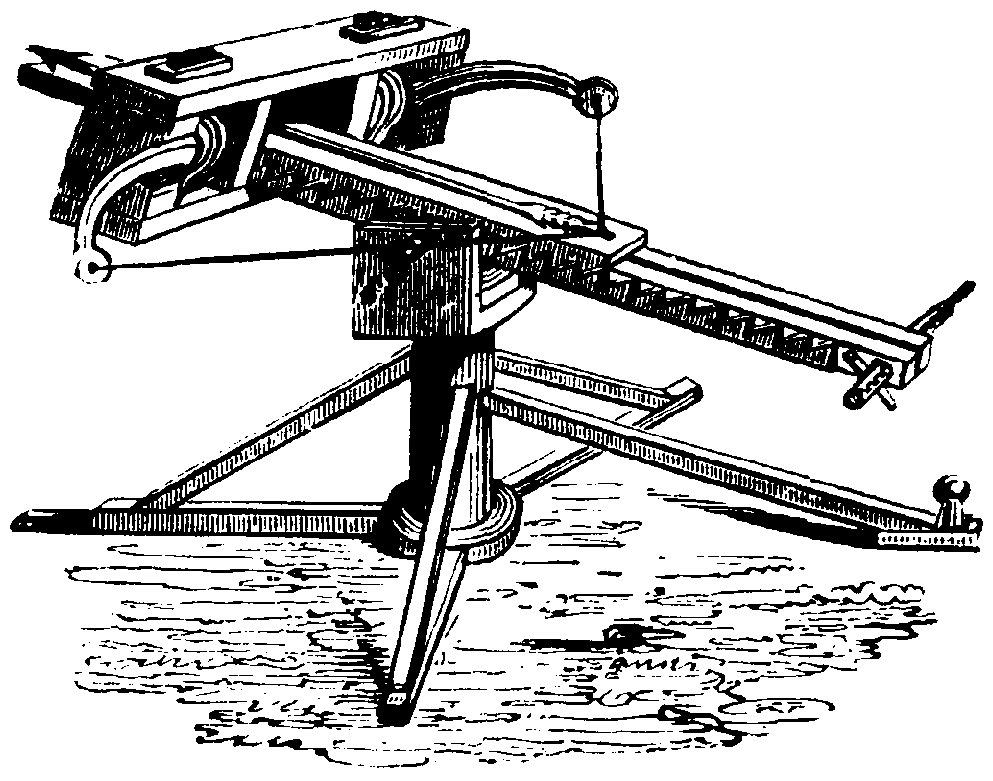
Catapulta

A catapulta was a Roman machine for throwing arrows and javelins, 12 feet (3.7 m) or 15 feet (4.6 m) long, at the enemy. The name comes from the Greek katapeltes (καταπέλτης), because it could pierce or 'go through' (kata) shields (peltas). The design was probably inherited, along with the ballista, from Greek armies. Some versions of the catapulta were portable. Smaller two-armed versions of the catapulta were known as scorpiones. The catapulta was made of wood and were placed on stands.

== See also ==
- Greek and Roman artillery
- Roman siege engines
