= Lithobolos =

Ancient stone-throwing artillery weapon

A lithobolos (Greek: λιθοβόλος) refers to any mechanical artillery weapon used and/or referred to as a stone thrower in ancient warfare. Typically this referred to engines that propel a stone along a flat track with two rigid bow arms powered by torsion (twisted cord), in particular all sizes of palintonon.

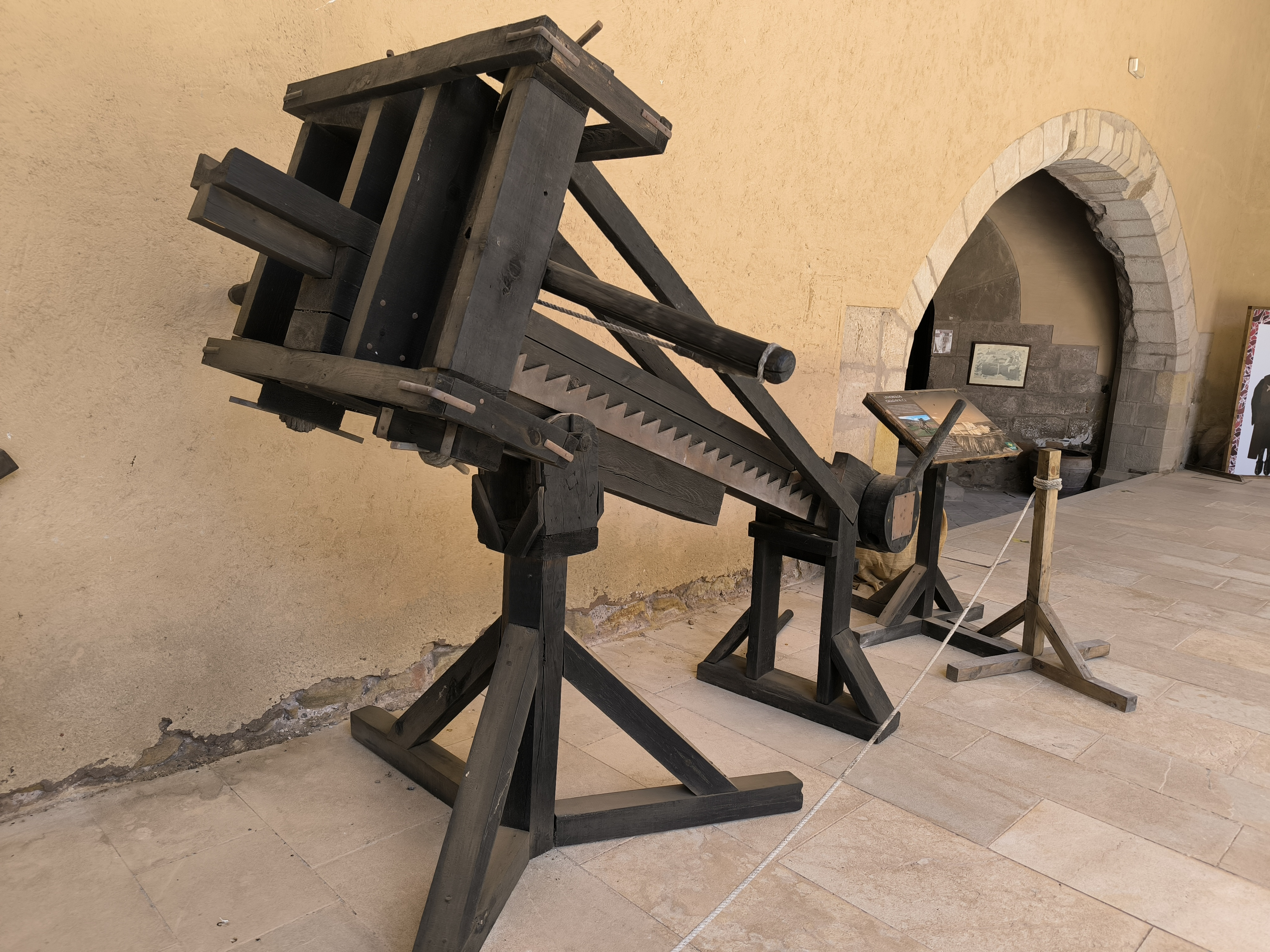
Reproduction of a Lithobolos in the castle of Mora de Rubielos

However, Charon of Magnesia referred to his flexion (bow) stone-thrower engine, a 9 feet (2.7 m) gastraphetes shooting 5–6 mina (5 pounds, 2.3 kg), as a lithobolos; Isidoros of Abydos reportedly built a larger 15-foot (4.6 m) version shooting 40-pound (18 kg). Also, the euthytonon, a single-arm torsion catapult, was referred to by contemporaries as a stone-thrower, as was its Roman evolution the onager.

Stone-throwers of the same class looked alike, with their stone capacity scaling mostly with overall size. Machine dimensions can be approximated mathematically based on the equivalent spring diameter.

== History ==
Buddhist texts record that King Ajatashatru of Magadha as having commissioned stone-throwers (mahāśilākaṇṭaka) in his campaign against the Licchavis in the 5th century BCE.

The first recorded European stone-thrower machines were used by the armies of Philip of Macedon and Alexander the Great. Polydias, Charias, and Diades of Pella, are the three engineers recorded designing machines for these armies, with Diades engineering at the sieges of Halicarnassus (334 BC) and Gaza (332 BC).

According to the Hellenistic engineer Philo of Byzantium, the typical effective range against fortifications was 150 metres (490 ft) with a load of 27 kilograms (60 lb); at that distance, walls had to be 5 metres (16 ft) thick to withstand the impact. Anti-personnel lithoboloi hurled much smaller balls, though arrow-shooters like the scorpio were preferred for these purposes. Super-heavy lithoboloi such as those fielded by Demetrius I Poliorcetes at the Siege of Rhodes (305 BC) threw stones of up to 75 kilograms (165 lb) and could be brought close to the walls in siege-towers. Balls of such size were found in small numbers in the arsenals of Carthage and Pergamon, corroborating ancient reports of their use. The Roman artillery engineer Vitruvius provided measurements for even more powerful stone-throwers, but it is not known whether these were ever used in combat. Modern experiments show that smaller projectiles could be hurled at least 400–500 metres (1,300–1,600 ft), while ancient authors record maximum ranges of as much as 700 metres (2,300 ft).

Siege engines of all types have been recorded as mounted on ships, with perhaps their first successful use at the Battle of Salamis (306 BCE) under the command of Demetrius I Poliorcetes. The enormous transport Syracusia possibly had the largest ship-mounted catapult of the ancient world, an 18-foot (5.5 m) machine that could fire arrows or stones up to 180 pounds (82 kg).

During the Siege of Syracuse (214–212 BCE), the Greek defenders used a barrage of machines developed by Archimedes, including powerful stone-throwing ballistas. Archimedes had the record for the largest stone launched in the ancient world; from a ship-mounted engine, reported at three talents (78 kilograms, 172 lb).

Other Greco-Roman engineers and recorders of lithoboloi include Zopyrus of Tarentum, Charon of Magnesia, Biton, Ctesibius, the engineer Dionysius of Alexandria, and Hero of Alexandria.

== Variants ==
The Roman onager, a catapult powered by rope torsion, was sometimes referred to as a stone-thrower.

Archimedes reportedly designed a steam-powered gun to shoot spherical projectiles using the same principle of gas pressure as a gunpowder cannon. Leonardo da Vinci drew a design for a steam gun that he named "Architronito", citing Archimedes.

Aristotle first observed the phenomenon of aerodynamic heating in the slight melting of the face of lead bullets thrown from ancient catapults and ballistas, using this to make some correct deductions of the physics of gases and temperature.

== See also ==
- Ballista
- Catapult
- Crossbow
- Trebuchet

== Bibliography ==
- Duncan B. Campbell and Brian Delf, Greek and Roman Artillery 399 BC–AD 363, New Vanguard series 89, Osprey Publishing Ltd., Oxford 2003. ISBN 1 84176 634 8
