= Ballista elephant =

Angkorian war elephant

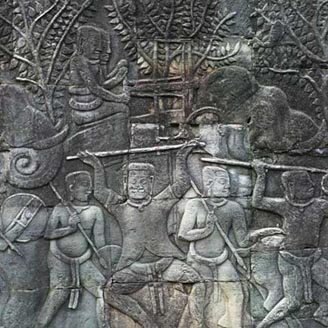
Ballista war elephants attacking the Chams.

A ballista elephant, also known as a Khmer ballista, is a war elephant mounted with a simple or double-bowed ballista which was used by the Angkorian civilization. They are considered as the summit of sophistication of Khmer weaponry comparable to the carrobalista in the legion of Vegetius.

== Description: the Khmer ballista ==
The ballista elephant is unique to Khmer civilization: the Khmer ballista is an over-proportioned crossbow which is more complicated in its mechanism than the Austroasiatic crossbow as it becomes a small catapult carried on the backs of elephants. Two bows facing each other are cocked simultaneously by sliding the rope attached to the rear bow by combining the two triggers. It was probably horizontal but, because Khmer stone carvers did not yet master the technique of perspective, the sculptor had to represent it vertically.

== History ==
=== Chinese vs. Austroasiatic origins ===
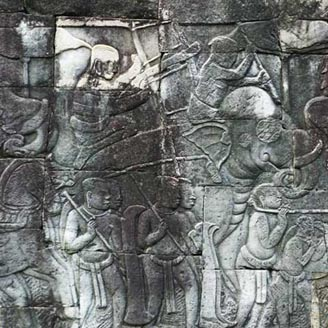
Khmer elephant mounted crossbow.

The ballista elephant is an evolution from the Austroasiatic crossbow. The discussions as to the origin of the Asian crossbow has been, to a lesser extent, applied to the ballista as well as almost identical war machines have been observed in China. Ballistas mounted on chariots with wheels are also represented on the walls of the Bayon; but the specifically Khmer character of this ballista is that it was mounted on elephants.

=== Use by Angkorian empire ===
It appears that the ballista was not of Khmer origin. However, it was a combination of various elements of Chinese warfare equipment, which was upcycled by creatively mounting it on the back of a war elephant. The elephant ballista is represented in the bas-relief of both Banteay Chhmar and Bayon. However, the carvings of the Bayon are more intricate and shows more technical mechanisms, the one in Banteay Chhmar shows a certain simplification of the weapon. In Bayon, the elephant ballista is loaded by soldiers in Cham uniform, suggesting that the Khmer ballista may have been integrated into the Angkorian army by Cham mercenaries. In both cases, they appear only in the great military parade which may suggest that the elephant ballista never made it to the battlefield for practical reasons. By all means, the ballista elephant is evidence of the technological sophistication of the Khmer army and weaponry.

=== Findings from modern archeology ===
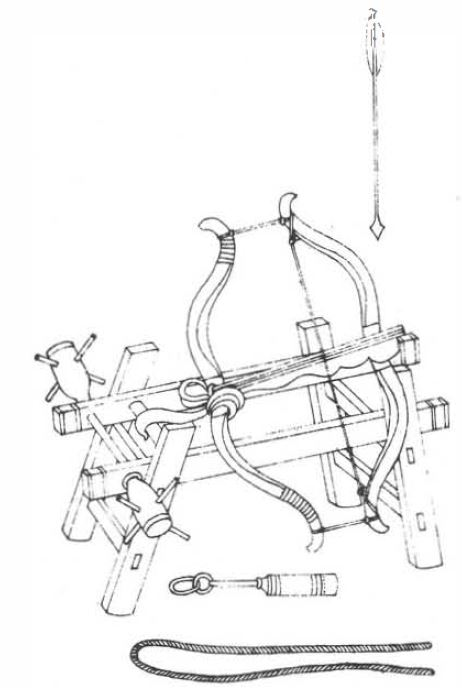
Large mounted crossbows known as "bed crossbows" were used as early as the Warring States period as Chinese siege weapons. Mozi described them as defensive weapons placed on top the battlements.

After French explorator Henri Mouhot led by Catholic missionary Emile Bouillevaux was the first foreigner to explore Angkor Wat with an archeological intention in the 1860, the discovery for the elephant ballista exerted a certain fantasy on the imagination of foreigners. Beyond fantasy, it also contributed to restoring the timeline of Cambodian history. It was first studied by Georges Groslier in 1921.

First of all, the complexity of the elephant ballista which was represented in the Bayon and not in Angkor Wat was one of the factors that led Georges Coedes to doubt his own chronology. In fact, he mistakenly believed that the Bayon was anterior to Angkor Wat, but the presence of the elephant ballista and other sophisticated military apparel in Bayon and its absence in Angkor Wat, which would have been a terrible recession, was a conundrum for him.

The elephant ballista also helped archeologists better understand the role, influence of and relationship of the Khmer civilization with China. In fact, it was first believed that the China ballista was taken from the Angkorian model. Hervey de Saint-Denys who was a Sinologist himself believed some elements of Chinese artillery, particularly the double-bow, could have been of Khmer origin. However, the giant ballista were already in use in 1127 during the Jingkang incident during the Jin–Song Wars. In 1282, the Cham defended themselves against Mongol invasions using such ballistas which were also found in Burma during the Second Mongol invasion of Burma. Therefore, rather than Khmer origin of the mounted bow, the spread of the ballista across Asia shows how Chinese warfare in the region played a major in the development of warfare technology in Asia.

== See also ==
- Carroballista

== Bibliography ==
- Mus, Paul (1929). "Etudes indiennes et indochinoises, III. Les balistes du Bàyon". Bulletin de l'École française d'Extrême-Orient. 29 (1): 331–341. doi:10.3406/befeo.1929.3243.
- Jacq-Hergoualc'h, Michel (2007). The Armies of Angkor: Military Structure and Weaponry of the Khmers. Orchid Press. ISBN 978-974-524-096-4.
