= Oxybeles =

Weapon used by the Ancient Greeks

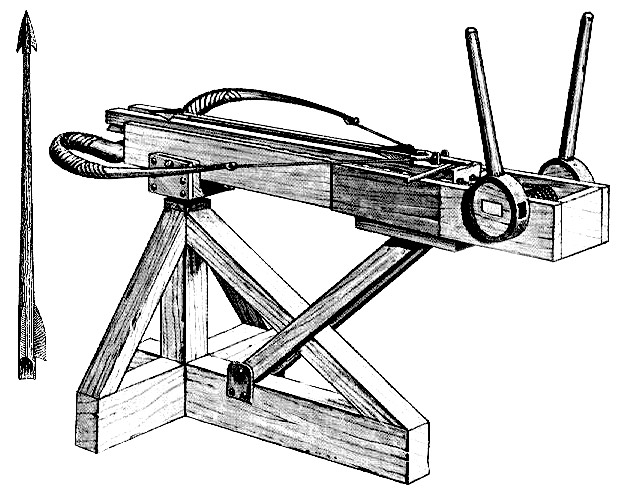
Oxybeles

The oxybeles (Greek: οξυβελής) was a weapon used by the Ancient Greeks starting in 375 BC. The word is derived from Ancient Greek: οξύς (oxys = sharp, pointed) and βέλος (belos = arrow). The weapon was basically an oversized gastraphetes, a composite bow placed on a stand with a stock and a trigger. It was supplanted by the scientifically engineered ballista. The difference between the two is the use of torsion power by the ballista. The most notable use of the oxybeles was under Alexander the Great's rule.

== See also ==
- Ballista
- Gastraphetes
- Scorpio (weapon)
