= Scorpio (weapon) =

Roman ballista-like torsion siege engine

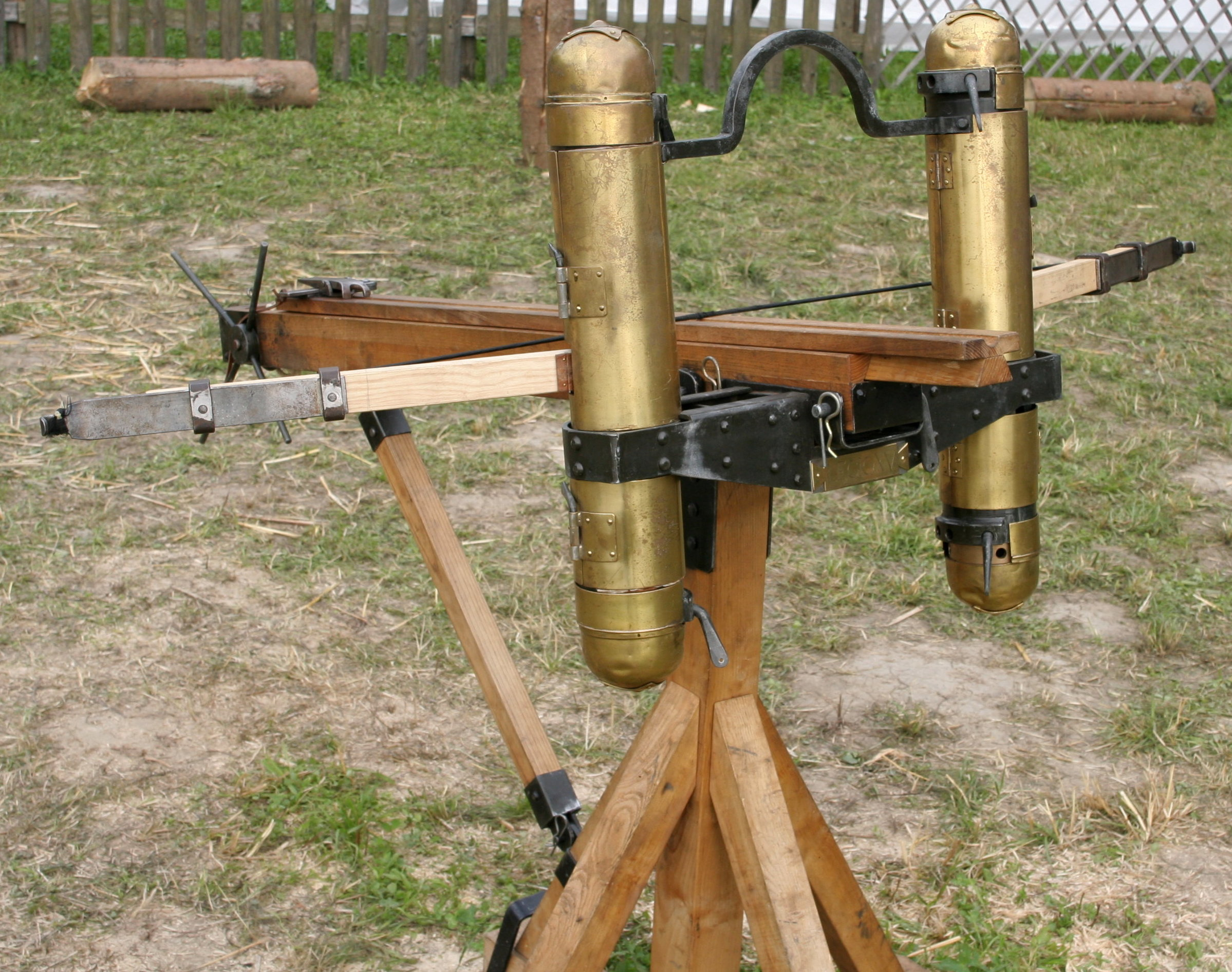
A modern reconstruction of the scorpio.

The scorpio or scorpion was a type of Roman torsion siege engine and field artillery piece. It was described in detail by the early-imperial Roman architect and engineer Vitruvius in the 1st century BC and by the 4th century AD officer and historian Ammianus Marcellinus.

== Design ==
Two versions are known: a horizontal two-armed variety like a ballista and a one-armed, vertical version otherwise referred to as an onager. The scorpion was made of a ground frame made of two beams joined together with crossbeams. Spring holes were drilled into the sides of the beams to allow for ropes to be placed in, thus allowing them to serve as sinew-springs. This gave the weapon more power. An arm made of wood known as the stilus, with iron hooks at the end, was used to hold the stone or bolt which was to be fired. The fourth century army officer and historian Ammianus Marcellinus witnessed the use of scorpiones during several engagements in the Persian wars of Constantius II, and described the one-armed version as synonymous with the onager, with the vertical upraised arm as the 'scorpion's sting'. The complexity of construction and in particular the torsion springs (which the Romans referred to as tormenta) led to great sensitivity to any variation in temperature or moisture, which limited their use. While this type of technology continued to be used in the Byzantine Empire, which was the continuation of the Roman Empire through the Middle Ages, it had disappeared in the Middle Ages in Western Europe. Unlike the onager, the scorpion only required one man to operate it.

== Use ==
Ancient authors mention the scorpidia/skorpidia (Σκορπίδια, "little scorpions"), which were used by Archimedes to defend Syracuse during the Roman siege of 213-212 BC. These devices were placed inside the city walls and fired arrows through small openings at Roman soldiers attacking from ships.

In 52 BC, during the siege of Avaricum in the war against the Gauls, Julius Caesar mentions the scorpio in use as an anti-personnel weapon against the Gallic town's defenders. The late third or early fifth century Roman author Vegetius described weapons like the scorpion mounted on carts for campaign use. According to Vegetius, the Roman Empire ideally fielded fifty-five carroballistae per legion, one for every century, of whom ten men would be deputed to operate the machine. These, which match Vitruvius's description and the depictions on Trajan's Column and the Column of Marcus Aurelius, he describes as mule-drawn, armour-piercing ballistae which "are to be used not only for defending the camp, but also in the field". The carroballista could be synonymous with, or very similar to, the scorpio mounted (and not merely transported) on a cart.

The bolt-firing scorpio had mainly two functions in a legion. In precision shooting, it was a weapon of marksmanship capable of cutting down any foe within a distance of 100 m (330 ft). In parabolic shooting, the range is greater, with distances up to 400 m (1,300 ft), and the firing rate is higher (3 to 4 shots per minute). With precision shooting the rate of fire was significantly less. Scorpions could be used in an artillery battery at the top of a hill or other high ground, the side of which was protected by the main body of the legion. The weight and speed of a bolt was sufficient to pierce enemy shields, usually also wounding the enemy so struck.

Like other ancient artillery, the scorpion could be cumbersome and costly campaign equipment, as it could be quite difficult to move quickly and usually acted as a fixed weapon used in infantry defense and for sieges, where it was used both as a siege weapon, fired by the besiegers from earthworks and siege towers, and as an element in cities' defences, mounted on walls and towers.

A further development of torsion siege engines scorpio was the cheiroballista.

== Media ==
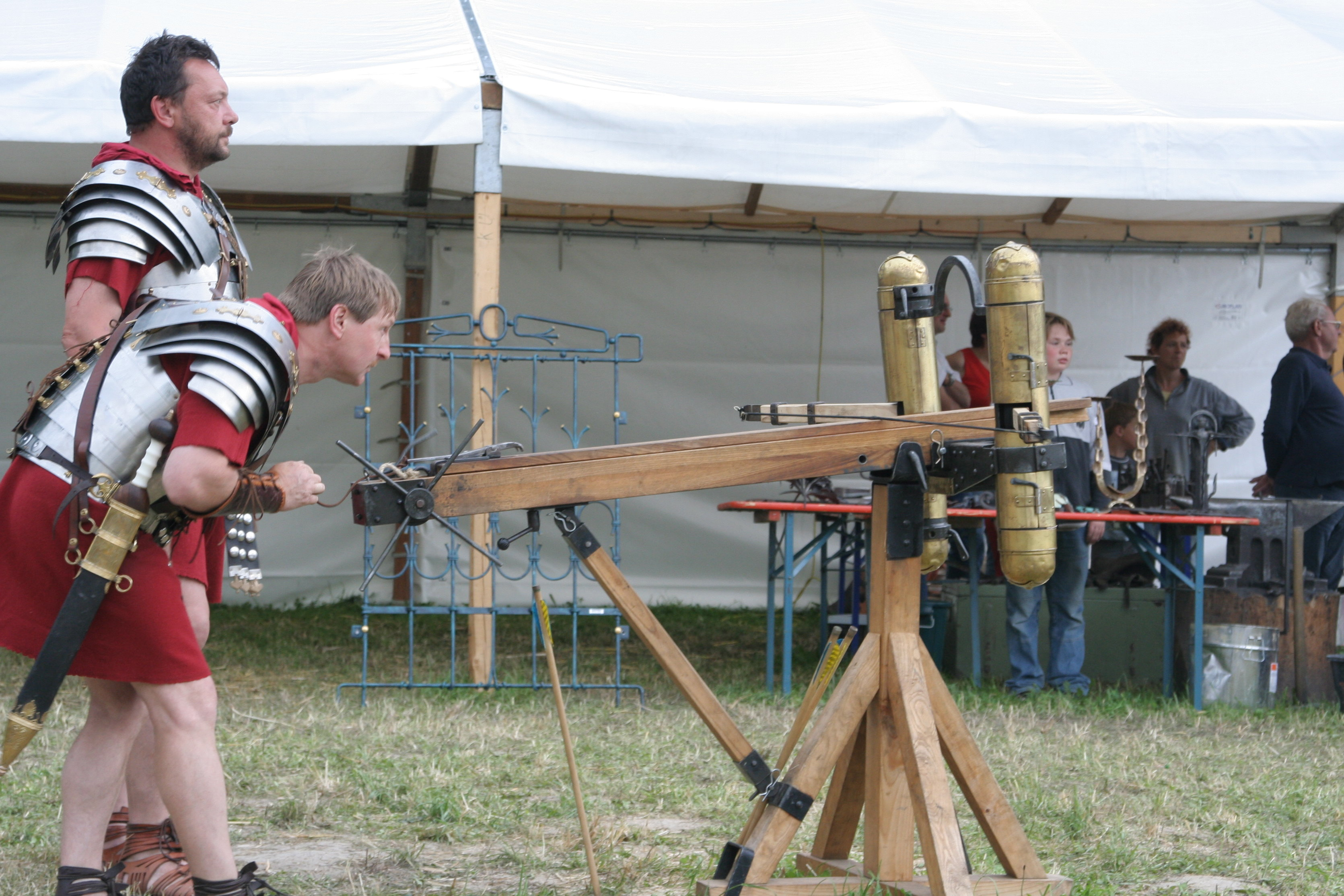
Modern reconstruction of a Scorpio

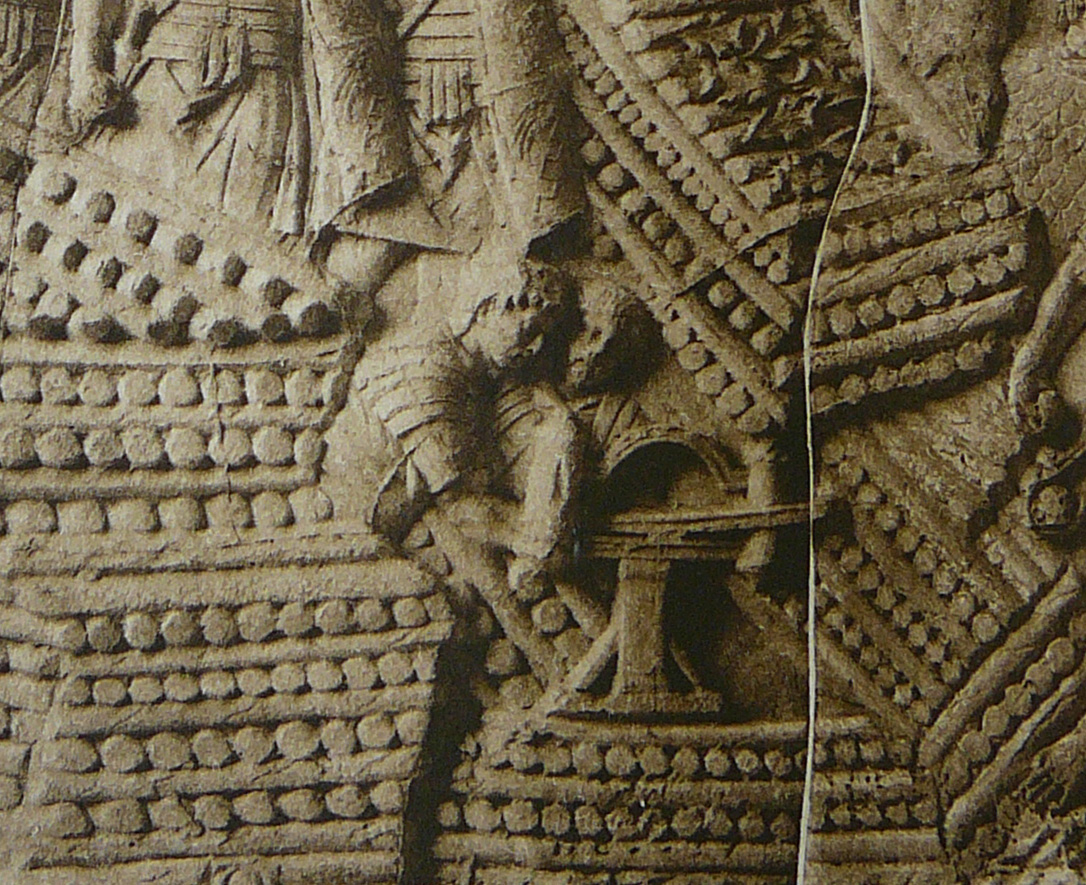
Scorpio in fortified position

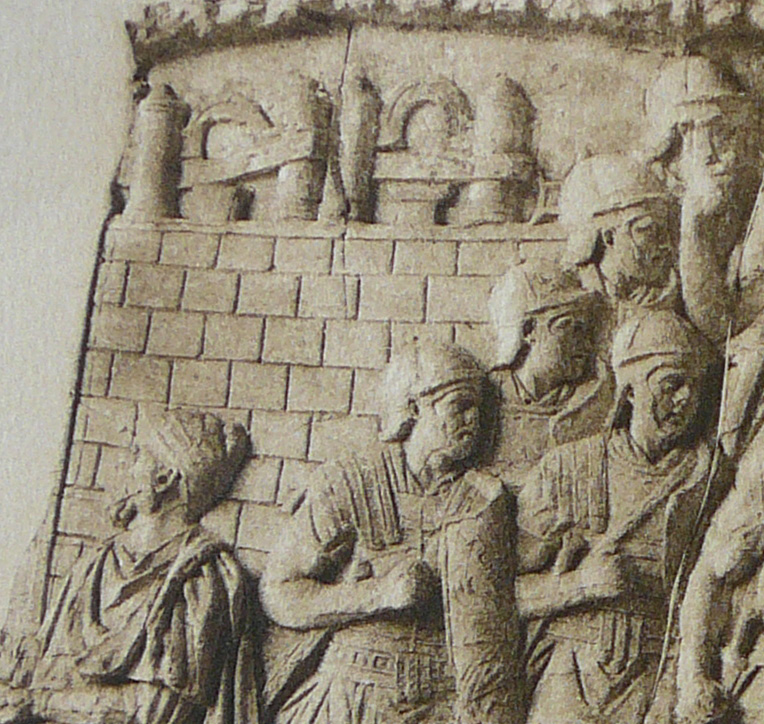
Scorpio mounted on walls

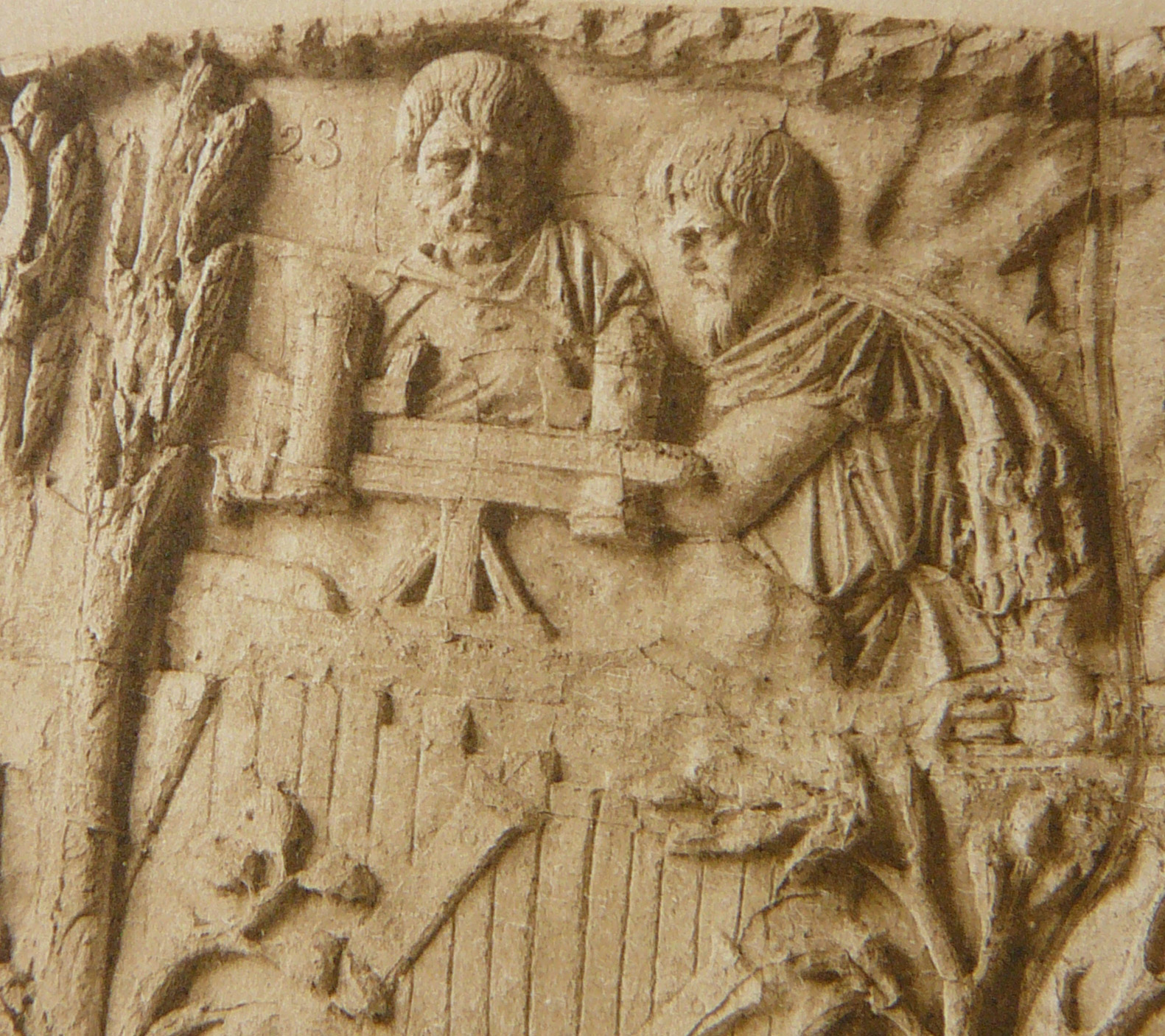
Dacian scorpio

== See also ==
- Ballista
- Gastraphetes
- Oxybeles

== Bibliography ==
- Duncan B. Campbell and Brian Delf, Greek and Roman Artillery 399 BC–AD 363, New Vanguard series 89, Osprey Publishing Ltd., Oxford 2003. ISBN 1 84176 634 8
- John Warry, Warfare in the Classical World, Salamander Books Ltd., London 1995. ISBN 0-8061-2794-5
