= Carroballista =

Cart-mounted ancient siege weapon

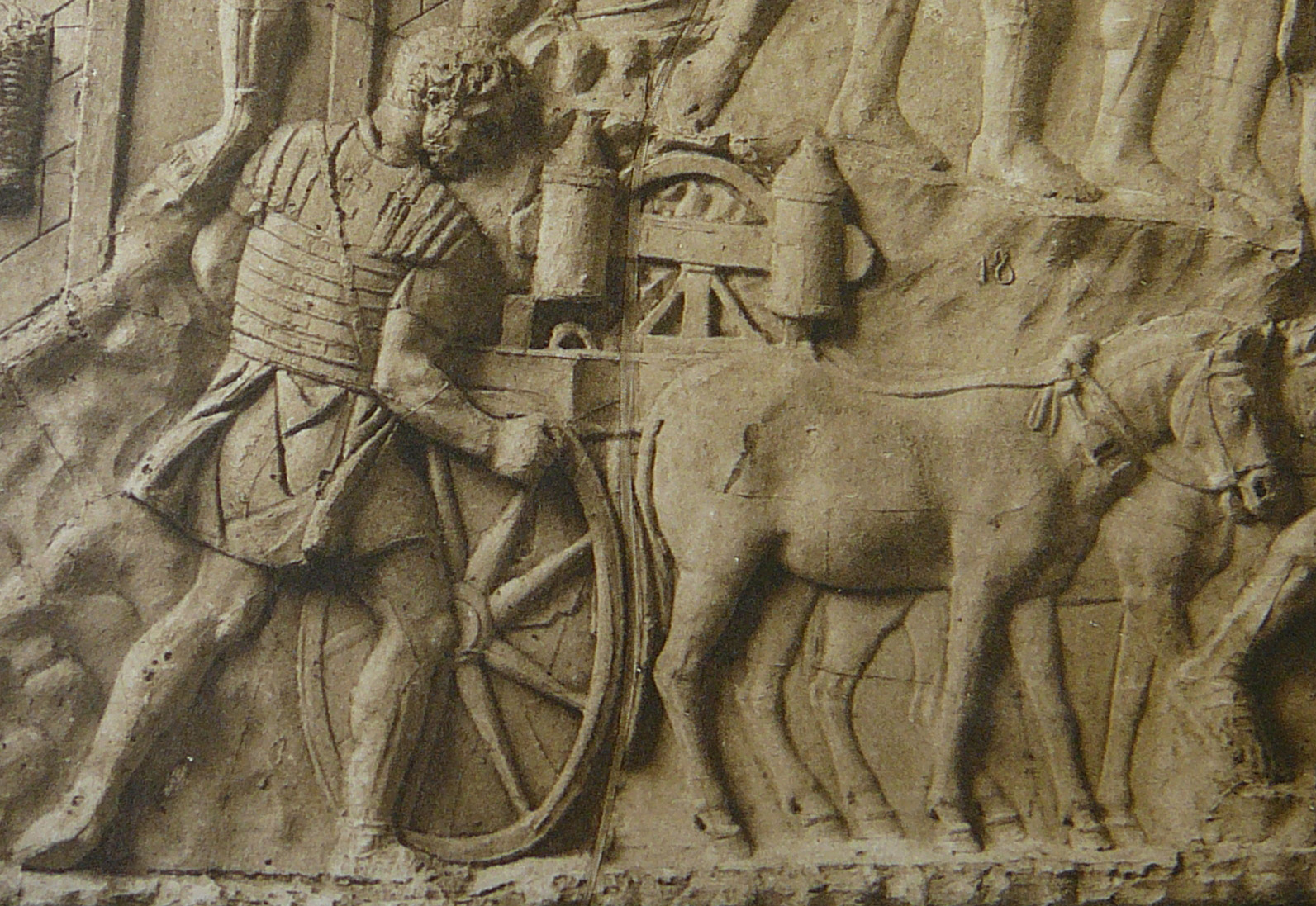
A Roman carroballista from the time of Trajan

Carroballista was an ancient, cart-mounted ballista, a type of mobile field artillery. According to the Roman author Vegetius (Epitoma rei militaris II.25), each legion had 55 carroballistae (one per centuria) which were arrow/bolt-shooter of the cheiroballistra (Greek: χειροβαλλίστρα) type. Vegetius says that each carroballista was carried by mules and operated by one contubernium (i.e., eight soldiers commanded by one decanus). Surviving representation of a carroballista are from the bas-reliefs of Trajan's Column (Scene XL and Scenes LXV/LXVI) and the Column of Marcus Aurelius.

== Structure ==
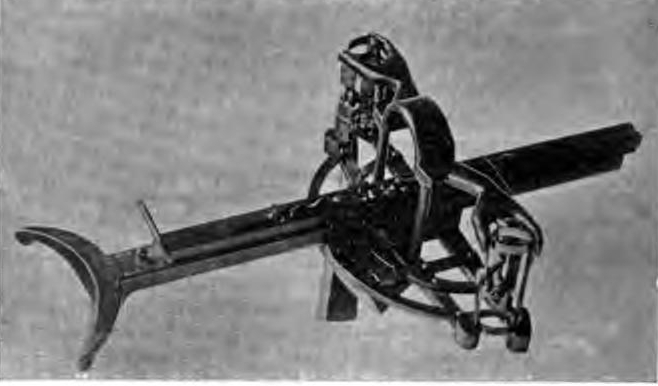
Modern reconstruction of one possible appearance of a cheiroballistra

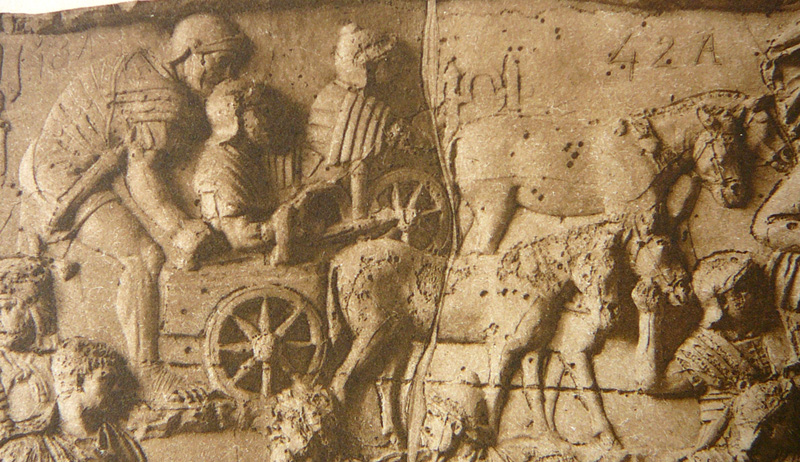
Roman cart-mounted ballista (Trajan's Column)

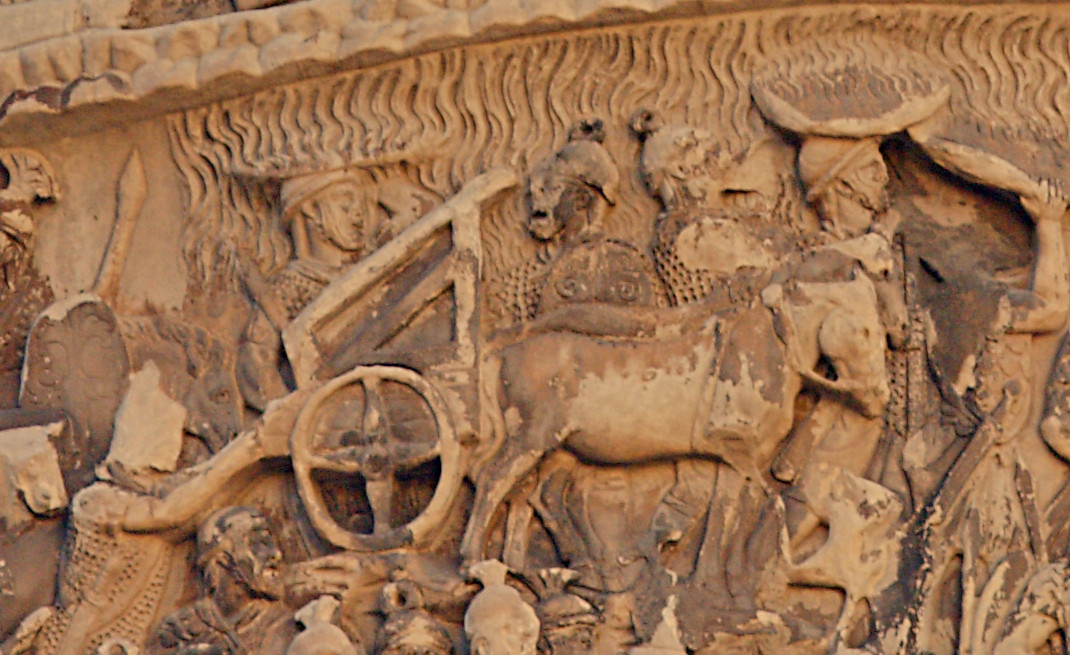
Roman cart-mounted ballista on the Column of Marcus Aurelius

The structure of the carroballista machine is identical to that of the cheiroballistra or manuballista, which translates in all its forms to "hand ballista", was an imperial-era Roman siege engine. Designed by Hero of Alexandria and mostly composed of metal (the spring mechanism and the skeins), it shot bolts that were smaller than those in other forms of ballistae and generally made of metal. It was the next major improvement after the scorpio. The name of the weapon is composed of the Greek words for 'hand' and 'shooter' implying that portable versions might also have existed, similar to crossbows.

It seems that the technical innovations introduced by the adoption of the cheiroballistra by the Roman army at the end of the 1st century AD made the use of the cart possible. In fact, the light but stout metal spring-frame and the wider space in the frontal part of the machine given by the arched strut conferred a greater manoeuvrability to the whole ballista.

== Shooting position ==
According to the Trajan's column representation (Scene XL), the carroballista was manoeuvred by one man mounted on the cart with the ballista and by another man positioned behind the cart and operating probably some sort of winch handle. The presence of the mules in front of the cart suggests that the carroballista could be easily moved through the battlefield whilst shooting bolts. This interpretation is not unanimously accepted by scholars.

It is not certain that the ballistae are actually shooting. The whole representation could be simply an image of carts transporting ballistae to their destination nest on the battlefield. But the bolts or arrows are here depicted in a ready-to-fire position, hazardous for artillerymen if the ballistae are simply being transported in order to be dismounted and deployed on the battlefield.

In another section of the Trajan's column (Scene LXVI) the simple transportation of the ballista is depicted. An artilleryman is pulling the cart near the wheel and this suggests that the whole machine must have been quite a heavy structure.

== Structure of the cart ==
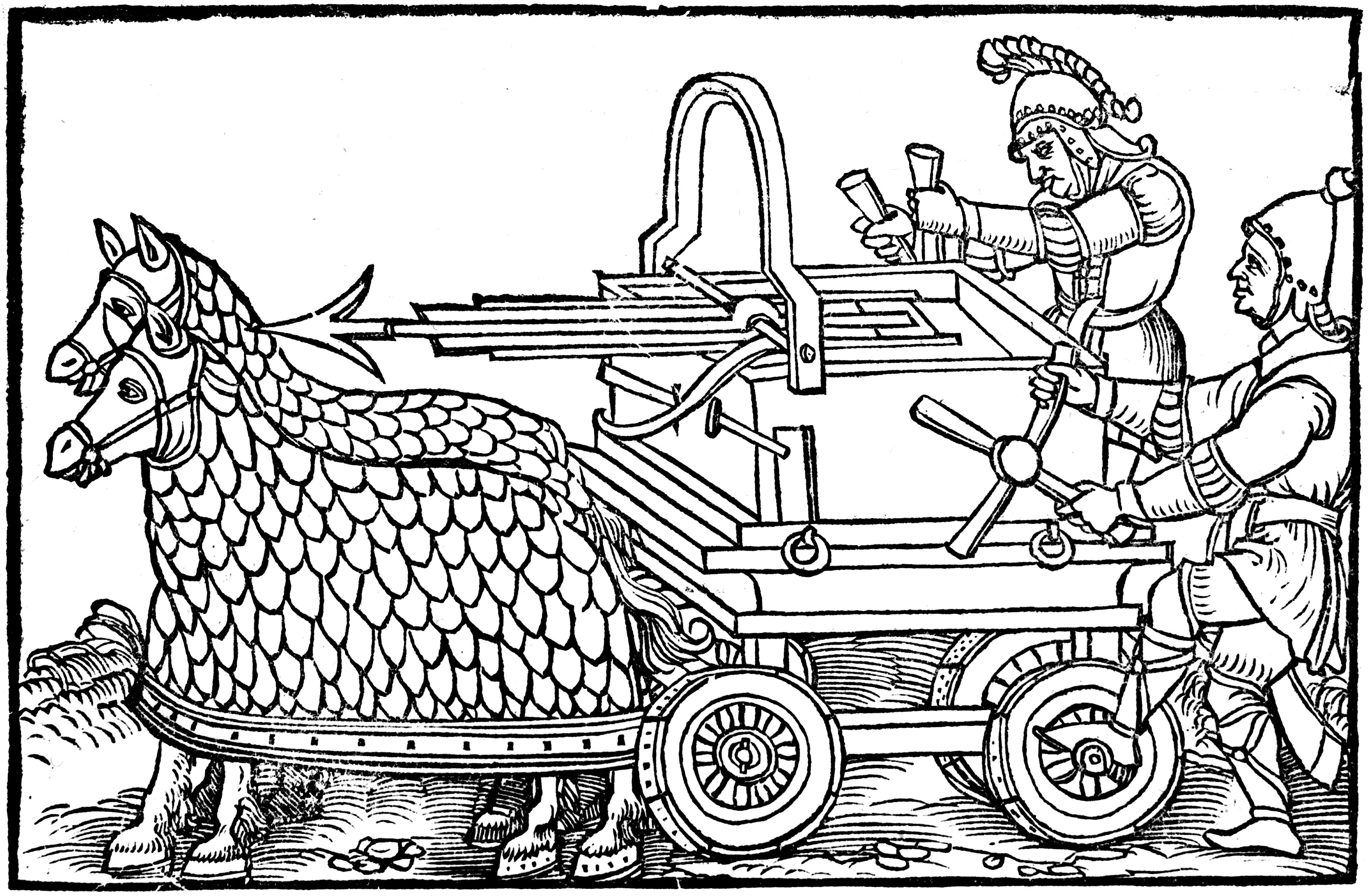
A four-wheeled ballista drawn by armoured horses, from an engraving illustrating a 1552 edition of De rebus bellicis.

It is sure that the cart was pulled by two mules or horses and that the size was probably that of standard Roman carts, i.e. c. 5 Roman feet (c. 147 cm) width (as depicted in the Trajan's Column, Scene XL and Scene LXVI), but the whole design of the cart is uncertain.

There are many hypotheses about the structure of the cart and probably different models of the same machine seem to have been in use at the same time:

- a simple two-wheel cart used to transport the ballista to its final emplacement on the field;
- a special two-wheel cart [i.e. carroballista] with a ballista mounted on the cart and with the frontal part positioned towards the mules;
- a special ballista simply mounted on two wheels and without cart (Trajan's Column Scene LXVI) and probably transported with the frontal part positioned rear, like Modern Era cannons, or forward and with a Transport-hook or Transport-hooks at the frontal position (see again Trajan's Column, Scene LXVI).
- a special four-wheel cart with a mounted ballista, as described in the book De Rebus Bellicis.

Many scholars do not have an opinion about this problem, due to scarce evidence, as clearly stated by Alan Wilkins.

== See also ==
- Ballista
- Ballista elephant
- Gastraphetes
- Roman siege engines
- Scorpio (weapon)
- Tachanka
- Cheiroballistra

== General and cited references ==
- Duncan B. Campbell and Brian Delf, Greek and Roman Artillery 399 BC–AD 363, New Vanguard series 89, Osprey Publishing Ltd., Oxford 2003. ISBN 1 84176 634 8
- J. P. Oleson, The Oxford Handbook of Engineering and Technology in the Classical World, Oxford 2006, page 699.
- W. Soedel and V. Foley, The Greek and Roman Ballistae, Scientific American, March 1979 [pp. 150 – 160]
- A. Wilkins, Roman Artillery, Princes Risborough 2003, pages 39–50. Wilkins, teacher of Classics at the University of Cambridge, produced for the first time real scale operating ballistae, among which the famous stone-thrower for the BBC and a cheiroballistra.
