= Cheiroballistra =

Classical-era small missile launcher

The cheiroballistra (Greek: χειροβαλλίστρα) was a small, two-armed, torsion-powered, metal-framed catapult known from an anonymous Greek treatise titled "Heron's Construction and Dimensions of the Cheiroballistra" (Ἥρωνος χειροβαλλίστρας κατασκευὴ καὶ συμμετρία). The name breaks into two parts: cheiro- (χειρο), a combining form of the word "hand," and ballistra (βαλλίστρα), from the Greek ballein ("to throw"). The weapon is known almost entirely from the manuscript; no archaeological find matches the proportions of a cheiroballistra as described in the text.

The treatise survives only in later copies, the earliest dating to perhaps the 10th century AD, preserved in a Byzantine compilation of Greek poliorcetic treatises. The lettering is almost complete, but captions survive only for the first diagram and are corrupt. Modern attempts to reconstruct the weapon have fallen into two broad camps. The first follows the text with as little emendation as possible, producing a personal-sized weapon operated by a single soldier: carried by hand rather than mounted on a stand, and drawn using the operator's body weight rather than a winch. This is the same operating style as the gastraphetes.

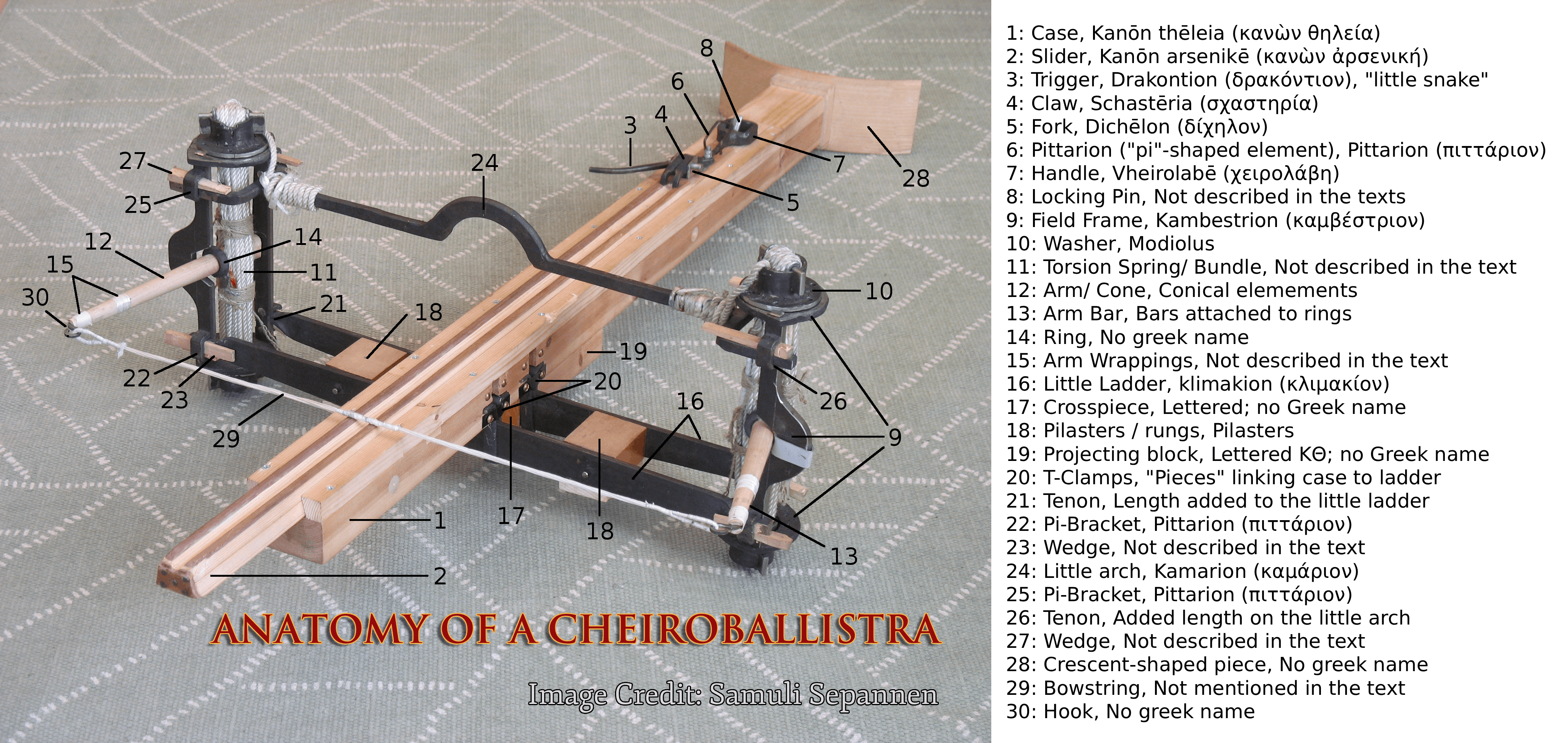
Anatomy of a cheiroabllistra created by Samuli Seppänen

The second holds that the manuscript's proportions are corrupt, particularly the spring diameter that powers the projectile, and that a machine built to the stated figures would be too weak to be effective; this camp reconstructs the cheiroballistra as a stand-mounted machine drawn by a windlass.

== The treatise ==
The attribution of the treatise to Hero of Alexandria is almost certainly an error. The four surviving manuscripts (designated M, F, P, and V) are all copies of copies, the oldest being manuscript M, dating to the 10th century AD. The attribution is doubted on linguistic grounds: the treatise uses different technical vocabulary from Heron's Belopoeica for the same components, and it favours Latin loanwords over their Greek equivalents. Whereas Heron wrote primarily in Greek using Greek vocabulary.

The attribution to Heron was probably added by a later Byzantine compiler. The text was originally anonymous but described a weapon resembling the manuballista of the Byzantine era, and the compiler is thought to have assigned Heron's name as a best guess. The treatise could have been written at any point between the late 1st century and the 6th century AD. Formatting in the surviving codex suggests the original was written on a papyrus scroll, which would place its origin nearer the earlier end of that range; a date of approximately AD 60–150 has been proposed. Because of the authorship question, the text is often referred to as "Pseudo- Heron's Cheiroballistra," with the author abbreviated to "PH."

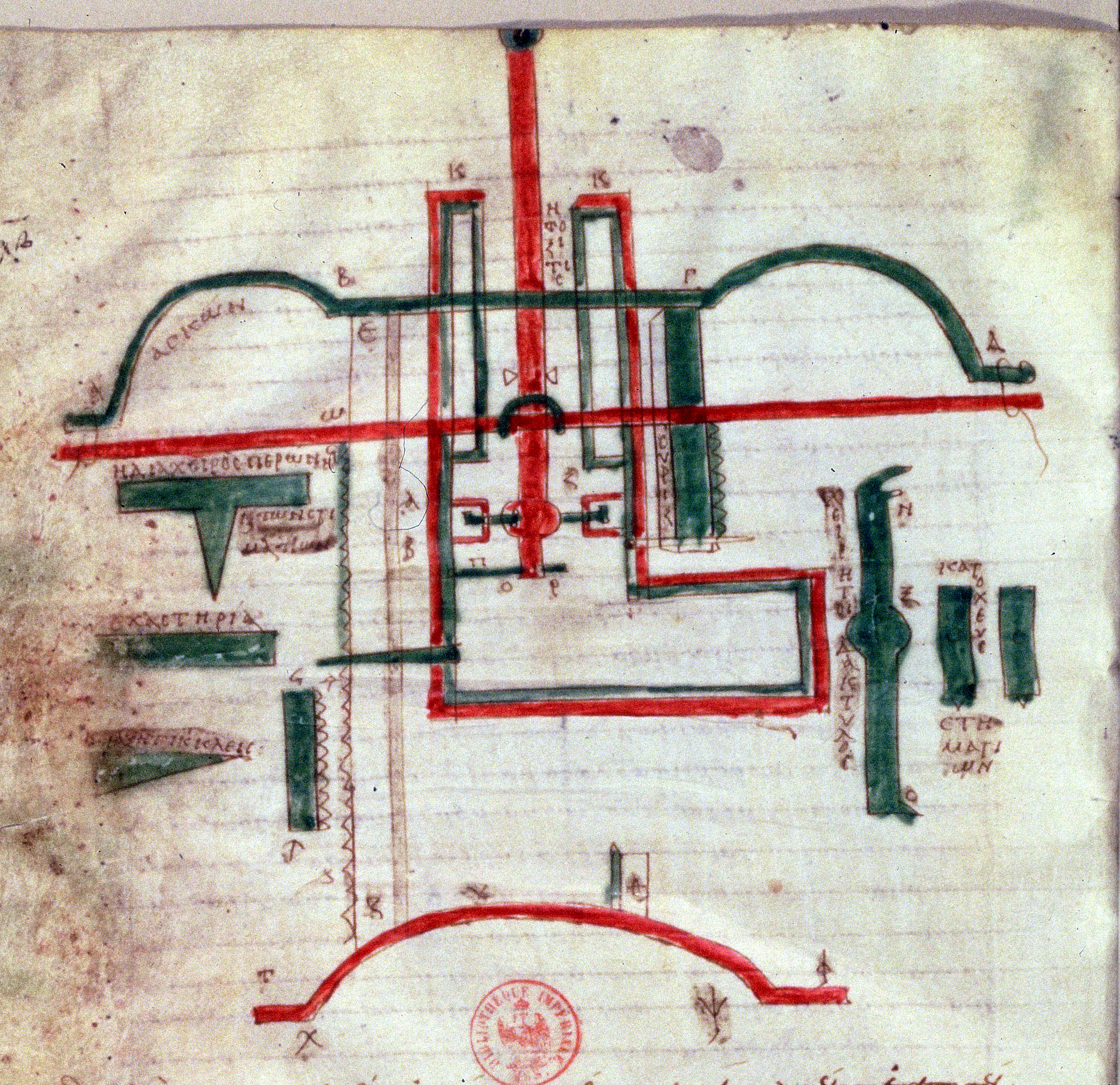
Image of the Gastraphetes diagram found in the same codex as the cheiroballistra. Codex Parisinus inter Supllementa Graeca

The manuscripts are almost certainly incomplete. They contain only a list of components, with no foreword introducing the weapon or describing its use, and no assembly instructions. They also omit any description of the projectile; since the length and weight of the missile were, according to the formulae of Vitruvius and Philon of Byzantium, the defining values from which a torsion engine's other dimensions were derived, this is a significant gap.

Siglum	Manuscript	Location	Folios	Notes
M	Codex Parisinus suppl. gr. 607	Bibliothèque Nationale, Paris	56r-58v	Oldest surviving copy, perhaps 10th c. (Byzantine compilation of Greek poliorcetic treatises). Diagrams closest to the lost archetype; lettering almost complete, but captions survive (corrupt) only for the first diagram.
F	Fragmenta Vindobonensia 120 (olim 113)	Österreichische Nationalbibliothek, Vienna	12r-14v	16th-c. careless partial copy of a lost 11th-c. manuscript "y"; figures rough, unlettered, but closely resemble M's.
P	Codex Parisinus gr. 2442	BnF, Paris	68v-70v	11th c., from lost compilation "z" (descended from y). Its field-frame diagram shows the bars most clearly offset.
V	Codex Vaticanus gr. 1164	Biblioteca Vaticana, Rome	106v-108v	Near-twin of P, same compilation.

== Description of components ==
Some passages of the manuscript do not resolve when translated directly. In describing the location and size of the "projecting block," for example, the text reads:

"Again, let the length ΑΘ, 1 foot 12 dactyls, of the Board ΑΒ be marked off, and the length ΑΚ 1 foot 1 dactyl; the remainder will be then ΚΘ, 7 dactyls. Again, let 1½ dactyls be marked off from the thickness of Board ΑΒ, and let it be cut along ΑΚ and ΛΘ so that the section ΚΘ remains at the original thickness, that is ΧΨΥΦ."

The arithmetic does not work: ΑΘ as given is 28 digits (1 foot 12 dactyls) and ΑΚ is 17 digits (1 foot 1 dactyl), so the remainder should be 11 digits, not the 7 the text states for ΚΘ. The figures are impossible as written, and the error is an old one, since all the manuscripts agree at this point.

In 1877, Victor Prou proposed a correction. In the ancient Greek numbering system letters stood for numbers, but here the problem is a corrupted reference letter rather than a corrupted numeral. Prou recognised that amending the first label from ΑΘ to ΛΘ resolves the paragraph: the stated lengths remain the same, but the segment now resolves correctly so that ΚΘ comes out at 7 digits and the marking points agree with the diagram. The correction alters the text at only one point and leaves the rest intact. The correction is now generally accepted. It illustrates how the treatise must be used: its surviving numbers are treated as evidence to be tested against geometry, against the accompanying diagrams, and against the physical proportions of excavated catapult parts, rather than as measurements to be taken at face value. Much of what is known about the weapon's dimensions is, in this sense, careful inference.

Section I: Case and slider
English name	Greek name	Description given in the text
Case (female board)	kanōn thēleia (κανὼν θηλεία), but the text just calls it the "female" of two dovetailed boards; kanōn = "board/rule"	Female dovetailed board ΑΒ. Length 3 ft 4 d (962-1040 mm); breadth 3½ d (65-70 mm); thickness 4½ d (83-90 mm). Dovetail channel cut 1 d (18-20 mm) deep; channelled portion 2½ ft + 6 d (851-920 mm), leaving 6 d (111-120 mm) unchannelled. Marked into segments (28 + 17 + 7 = 52 d). 1½ d (28-30 mm) cut from the thickness along the ends, leaving a 7 d (130-140 mm) block at the full 4½ d (83-90 mm).
Slider (male board)	kanōn arsenikē (κανὼν ἀρσενική); "male" board	Male dovetailed board. Length 3 ft (888-960 mm); width "about 2½ d" (46-50 mm); thickness 1¼ d (23-25 mm). Its male dovetail is to be suited to the case's female channel. (The missile groove on its top is shown in the diagram but not mentioned in the text.)
Projecting block	(lettered ΚΘ; no Greek name)	The 7 d (130-140 mm) portion of the case left at full 4½ d (83-90 mm) thickness after the ends are cut down.
Crescent-shaped piece (stomach-rest)	("crescent-shaped piece"; no Greek name in the text)	Bored in the middle with a quadrangular hole; fixed firmly to the end Δ of the case. No dimensions given.

The text explicitly does not give the exact relative positions of fork, claw, and trigger on the slider. Iriarte notes they can only be inferred from the diagram.

Section II: Trigger mechanism
English name	Greek name	Description given in the text
Handle	cheirolabē (χειρολάβη)	Made of iron, "with the shape illustrated." Bored through; held by a pin through the slider and the handle's hole, so it can revolve. No dimensions for the handle itself beyond the bore positions.
Fork (double fork)	dichēlon (δίχηλον)	A quadrangular tenon with its part as a double fork. Bored and pinned to the claw so the claw moves freely; lowered into a hole marked 5 d (92-100 mm) along the slider and bonded firm.
Claw	schastēria (σχαστηρία); text calls it the "bolt"	Pivots on the fork via a pin. Has a longitudinal incision 1 d (18-20 mm) long.
Trigger	drakontion (δρακόντιον), "little snake"	Bored and pinned through the slider 4 d (74-80 mm) from a marked point, so it moves easily around the pin; immobilises the claw's tail from below.
Pittarion ("pi"-shaped element)	pittarion (πιττάριον), shaped like the letter Π	Lowered into the slider. A hole bored, then 4½ d (83-90 mm) measured off to a second hole. The 4½ d figure is wider than the whole slider (~2½ d, 46-50 mm). The passage is corrupt;^{[10]} the text does not securely give its placement.
Pin / bond	(no Greek name; "pin")	Repeatedly specified: round pins through round holes establish the moving or fixed "bonds" of the mechanism. No dimensions.

Section III: Field-frames, washers, levers
English name	Greek name	Description given in the text
Field-frame	kambestrion (καμβέστριον), pl. kambestria	The assembly "called field-frames." Built from the bars, rings, and pi-brackets below; two bars per frame, set 3½ d (65-70 mm) apart.
Field-frame bar	kanōn (κανών), same word as the boards	4 iron bars. Length 10½ d (194-210 mm); breadth "a little more than ⅔ d" (12-13 mm); thickness "so that they cannot be easily bent" (Schneider supposed a lacuna here; the actual figure may be lost, though it is often deduced at ~5-6 mm). One bar of each frame has a mid-length bulge/curve shown in the diagram but unmentioned in the text.
Ring (on the bars)	(no separate Greek name; "rings")	Attached to the bars. "Breadth" (inner opening) 2 d (37-40 mm); "width" (solid part) 1 d (18-20 mm); thickness as the bars.
Pi-bracket	pittarion (πιττάριον), same word as the trigger element	8 elements "in the form of a pi," attached to the bars. Same width and thickness as the bars; breadth (inner opening) ⅔ d (12-13 mm).
Washer	(text: "light bronze cylinders"; the term modiolus is borrowed by convention from other treatises)	4 cylinders. Length 2 d (37-40 mm); thickness as the bars; "the diameter of the breadth 1⅓ d" = the inner bore = the spring diameter (~25-27 mm). A ring round the convex surface, 1¼ d (23-25 mm) from the end, width ⅔ d (12-13 mm), thickness as the bars. Diametral incisions cut for the levers.
Lever	(text: "bars" slotted into the washers; the term epizygis is borrowed by convention)	4 bars slotted tightly into the washer incisions on their narrow edges. Length 3 d (56-60 mm); width ⅔ d (12-13 mm).

Section IV: The two struts
English name	Greek name	Description given in the text
Little arch (upper strut)	kamarion (καμάριον)	Span ΒΓΔ 1 ft 7½ d (435-470 mm); the interval formed by the arch 5 d (92-100 mm); portions ΒΓ, ΓΔ 4 d (74-80 mm) each; further portions 2 d (37-40 mm) each; gap between the fork prongs "about 3½ d" (65-70 mm); thickness as the field-frame bars. Forked ends (shown turned 90° in the diagram).
Little ladder (lower strut)	klimakion (κλιμακίον)	Two bars of unequal length: 1 ft 10 d (481-520 mm) and 1 ft 8 d (444-480 mm). Width 2 d (37-40 mm) at the end portions, 1¼ d (23-25 mm) elsewhere. Tenon thickness lost in a lacuna (Vincent); tenon length 2 d (37-40 mm). Bars divided at three equal points; quadrangular holes longitudinally, round holes at the other stations.
Crosspiece	(lettered; no Greek name)	Length (without tenons) 3 d (56-60 mm); width 2½ d (46-50 mm). Its tenons nailed to the bars; sets the bar separation at 3 d (56-60 mm).
Pilasters / rungs	(text: "pilasters")	Length (without tenons) 3 d (56-60 mm); width 2½ d (46-50 mm). Inserted into the holes in the bars.
T-clamps	(text: the "pieces" linking case to ladder)	Nailed to the ladder bar and to the case on both sides of the crosspiece. Length 3 d (56-60 mm) (F) / 1 d (18-20 mm) (M); width 1 d (18-20 mm); "a suitable thickness." Bored down the middle; 2½ d (46-50 mm) apart.

Section V: Arms
English name	Greek name	Description given in the text
Arm (conical element)	(text: "conical elements"; no Greek name)	2 cones. Length 11 d (204-220 mm); tip thickness ½ d (9-10 mm); base thickness 1 d (18-20 mm). Longitudinal quadrilateral grooves; tenons at the tips.
Arm bar (with ring and hook)	(text: "bars … attached to rings")	Fitted to the cones' tenons and grooves, able to slide along them. Length, width, and thickness are NOT given. The text ends here. (Universally read as a break since Wescher; Iriarte notes those dimensions should, by the treatise's own sequence, have come before the hook height, so the section may actually be complete.)
Ring (on the arm bar)	(no Greek name)	Attached to the bar; mentioned without dimensions.
Hook	(no Greek name)	At the bar ends. Height ½ d (9-10 mm).

Parts the weapon needs but the treatise never names at all
English name	Greek name	Description given in the text
Bowstring	-	Not mentioned anywhere in the treatise.
Bolt / missile	-	Not mentioned; its groove appears in diagram 1 only.
Torsion spring cord	-	Not mentioned; the washers house it, but the cord and its material are absent.
Wrappings, wedges, shims, axle details	-	Not described; later builders supply them (Seppänen reads the silence as an assumed expert reader).

== Historical references ==
Scholars relate the cheiroballistra to the artillery depicted on Trajan's Column (dedicated AD 113). The reliefs show arched iron frames, torsion springs that appear to be covered, and part of the case or slider protruding from the front of the machine. Because the column's carvings are stylised, firm conclusions are difficult, but the thin iron frames are nonetheless distinct from the thicker wooden frames of the earlier Hellenistic type.

The reliefs attest the use of iron-framed catapults in the Dacian Wars. The machines depicted appear to be of a larger type, usually identified as the carroballista ("cart-ballista"); they may belong to the same family of weapons as the cheiroballistra.

Several late-Roman texts mention related weapons. In Vegetius's Epitoma rei militaris, the manuballista, arcuballista, and carroballista are named. Vegetius does not describe them in detail, but given the late- 4th-century date of his work they were plausibly of the iron-framed type. Some scholars hold that Vegetius's manuballista is synonymous with the cheiroballistra of the treatise. The arcuballista ("bow-ballista") is generally thought to have been a non-torsion crossbow, which at least shows that the Romans were familiar with the crossbow principle.

Caution is warranted in relying on these names, since both the terms and the machines they denoted changed over time. Vegetius notes that weapons once called scorpions were in his day called manuballistae, while the later writer [[Ammianus Marcellinus]] states that the onager was formerly called the scorpion. The terminology is therefore an unreliable guide. The archaeological record indicates that ancient armies used a wide variety of siege engines rather than a single standard design, which leaves the sizes of machines named in texts such as Vegetius's open to speculation. Because the cheiroballistra is not named in any surviving find, no excavated machine matches the treatise's dimensions, and no manuscript for a manuballista survives, the relationship between the texts and the physical evidence remains uncertain.

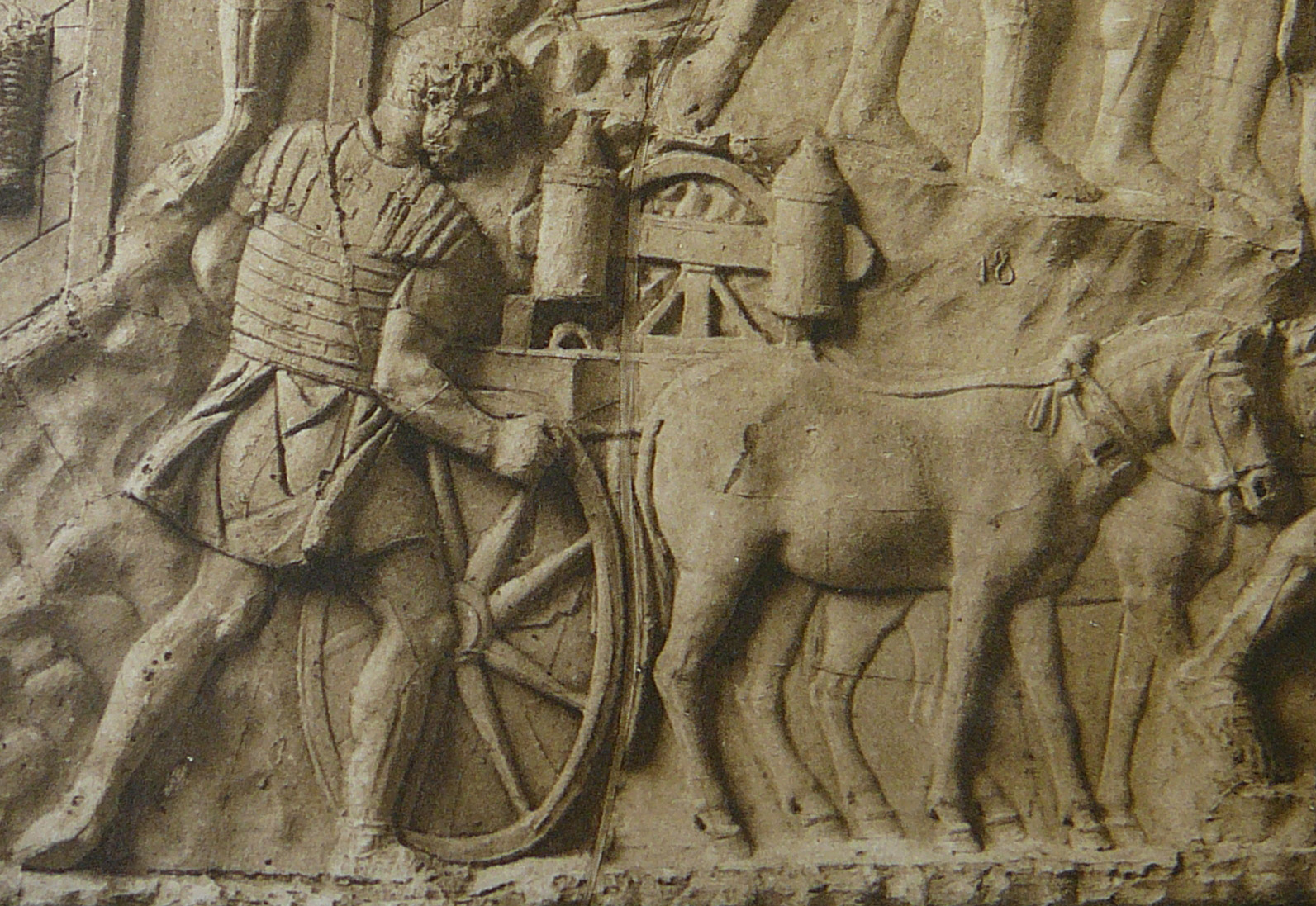
Carroballista depicted on Trajan's column

Among the most important archaeological finds bearing on the question are those from Orșova, Gornea, Hatra, Lyon, and Qasr Ibrim. The Orșova find produced the only kamarion ("arched strut") yet recovered. It confirmed that the machines depicted on Trajan's Column were real and deployed, and it lent support to the treatise's description of the metal arch, although the excavated strut is considerably larger than the one described in the manuscript.

== Modern reconstructions ==
Working from Carle Wescher's edition of the manuscript, Victor Prou collaborated with A. J. H. Vincent to translate the text into French and Latin. Prou interpreted the cheiroballistra as a weapon roughly the size of a medieval crossbow, drawn by pressing the "crescent shaped piece" against the operator's belly and the "slider" against the ground. He further suggested that the arms travelled their arc on the inside of the frame, a configuration later known as "inswinging." Prou's reconstruction has been criticised chiefly for its use of steel springs as the power source, which would not have been available in antiquity.

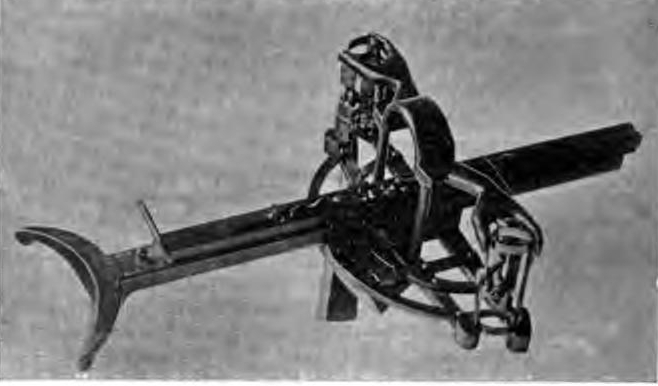
Victor Prou's Cheiroballistra

In 1906, Rudolf Schneider, working alongside the engineer Erwin Schramm, studied much of the surviving body of texts on ancient artillery. Schneider was the first to argue that the treatise was not written by Heron. He also argued that "Pseudo-Heron's Cheiroballistra" did not describe a catapult at all, holding that the text was a fragment from an ancient technical compilation that was never meant to be assembled into a single machine; his view was influential for several decades.

E. W. Marsden attempted a reconstruction in his 1971 Greek and Roman Artillery: Technical Treatises. As with Prou and Schneider, no archaeological remains of a metalframed ballista had yet been found. Marsden's English translation became the standard, though he omitted the manuscript diagrams from his book. His reconstruction was a small, iron-framed, outswinging torsion arrow-shooter firing an estimated 405 mm bolt. Marsden was the first to argue that the spring diameter given in the text was incorrect, proposing a diameter of about 47 mm where the text gives about 25 mm; he also roughly doubled the height of the spring. Marsden's reading of the field-frame bar length as 20 digits, against the manuscript's 10½, corresponds to this enlargement. The increase implied roughly a sixfold gain in power, which in turn required a heavier machine; Marsden accordingly mounted it on a stand and drew it with a windlass.

Understanding of metal-framed torsion artillery changed substantially through archaeology, particularly the work of Dietwulf Baatz, Nicolae Gudea, and Christiane Boube-Piccot. Excavations on the Danube frontier at Gornea and Orșova recovered iron frames that Baatz identified as torsion-artillery components, whose dimensions confirmed that the texts accurately described wide, low-framed engines. The small frame found at Gornea supported the manuscript's figures over Marsden's enlargement: the field-frame bar height matched the 10½ digits of the text rather than Marsden's 20.

Alan Wilkins revisited the cheiroballistra in 1995, building on Marsden and favouring his interpretation of a larger, windlass-drawn, stand-mounted machine. Wilkins produced an updated translation that restored the diagrams Marsden had omitted. While he sought to correct some of Marsden's errors, his reconstruction has itself been criticised as owing more to Wilkins's own design than to the treatise.

The reconstructions of Marsden and Wilkins established a view of the cheiroballistra as a standmounted, winch-drawn machine resembling those on Trajan's Column. Commenting on this line of work, Aitor Iriarte wrote that Wilkins, "following the trail marked by Marsden, has produced a field-gun out of the instructions for constructing a rifle." The contrasting position, summarised by Samuli Seppänen as the principle that "the reconstruction is made to fit the manuscript, not vice versa," holds that the unamended dimensions yield a working weapon.

In 2000, Iriarte produced a reconstruction arguing that the dimensions given in the text could yield a functioning, hand-held, belly-drawn torsion weapon, returning to a configuration similar to the one Prou had proposed in 1877. Using the smaller spring diameter of the text, he found the windlass and stand unnecessary, resulting in a lighter and more portable engine, on the principle that the text should be regarded as correct until clearly shown otherwise. Iriarte also pointed to small darts, such as the roughly 185 mm example found at Qasr Ibrim, as evidence for what the weapon may have shot, and cited Vegetius's reference to "tiny, thin darts"; such a dart is less than half the length of the bolt proposed for Marsden's machine. In 2003, Iriarte published "The Inswinging Theory," revising his own work to argue that the cheiroballistra was an inswinging machine, and reporting that this orientation produced roughly a 40% increase in range. His reconstruction has been regarded as closer to the source than the Marsden–Wilkins machines because it emends the text far less, though Iriarte himself stressed that much of his work remains conjectural in the absence of an actual find.

Between 2010 and 2018, Samuli Seppänen built a cheiroballistra closely following Iriarte and the manuscripts. The result was a machine weighing 9.6 kg that shot 49 g bolts at 69 m/s, which he presented as experimental evidence that the small spring diameter of the text is capable of producing an effective weapon.
