= Torsion siege engine =

Type of artillery relying on a twisting force to launch projectiles

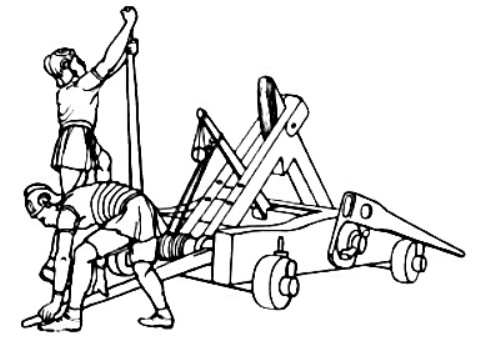
Sketch of an onager, a type of torsion siege engine

A torsion siege engine is a type of siege engine that utilizes torsion to launch projectiles. They were initially developed by the ancient Macedonians, specifically Philip II of Macedon and Alexander the Great, and used through the Middle Ages until the development of gunpowder artillery in the 14th century rendered them mostly obsolete.

== History ==
=== Greek ===
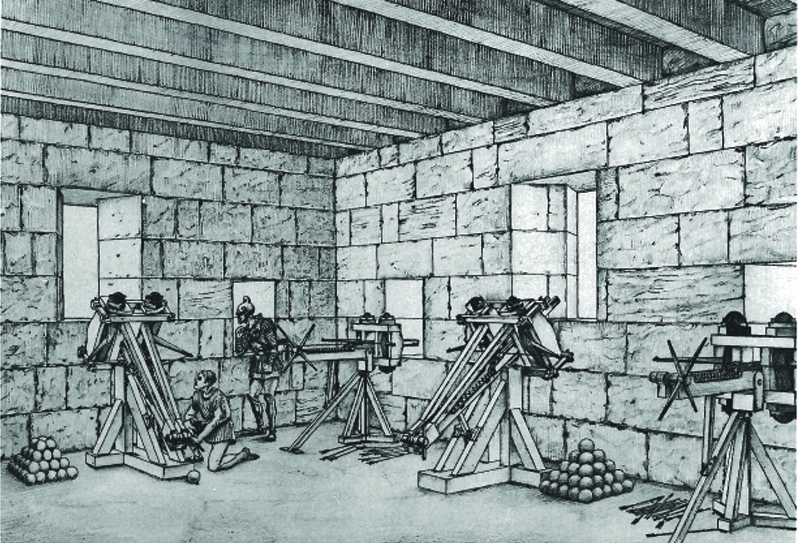
Modern depiction of a Hellenistic artillery tower equipped with torsion ballistas

Preceding the development of torsion siege engines were tension siege engines that had existed since at least the beginning of the 4th century BC, most notably the gastraphetes in Heron of Alexandria's Belopoeica that was probably invented in Syracuse by Dionysius the Elder. Though simple torsion devices could have been developed earlier, the first extant evidence of a torsion siege engine comes from the Chalcotheca, the arsenal on the Acropolis in Athens, and dates to c. 338 - 326 BC. It lists the building's inventory that included torsion catapults and its components such as hair springs, catapult bases, and bolts. The transition from tension machines to torsion machines is a mystery, though E.W. Marsden speculates that a reasonable transition would involve the recognition of the properties of sinew in previously existing tension devices and other bows. Torsion based weaponry offered much greater efficiency over tension based weaponry. Traditional historiography puts the speculative date of the invention of two-armed torsion machines during the reign of Philip II of Macedon circa 340 BC, which is not unreasonable given the earliest surviving evidence of siege engines stated above.

The machines quickly spread throughout the ancient Mediterranean, with schools and contests emerging at the end of the 4th century BC that promoted the refinement of machine design. They were so popular in ancient Greece and Rome that competitions were often held. Students from Samos, Ceos, Cyanae, and especially Rhodes were highly sought after by military leaders for their catapult construction. Torsion machines in particular were used heavily in military campaigns. Philip V of Macedon, for example, used torsion engines during his campaigns in 219-218 BC, including 150 sharp-throwers and 25 stone-throwers. Scipio Africanus confiscated 120 large catapults, 281 small catapults, 75 ballistas, and a great number of scorpions after he captured New Carthage in 209 BC.

=== Roman ===
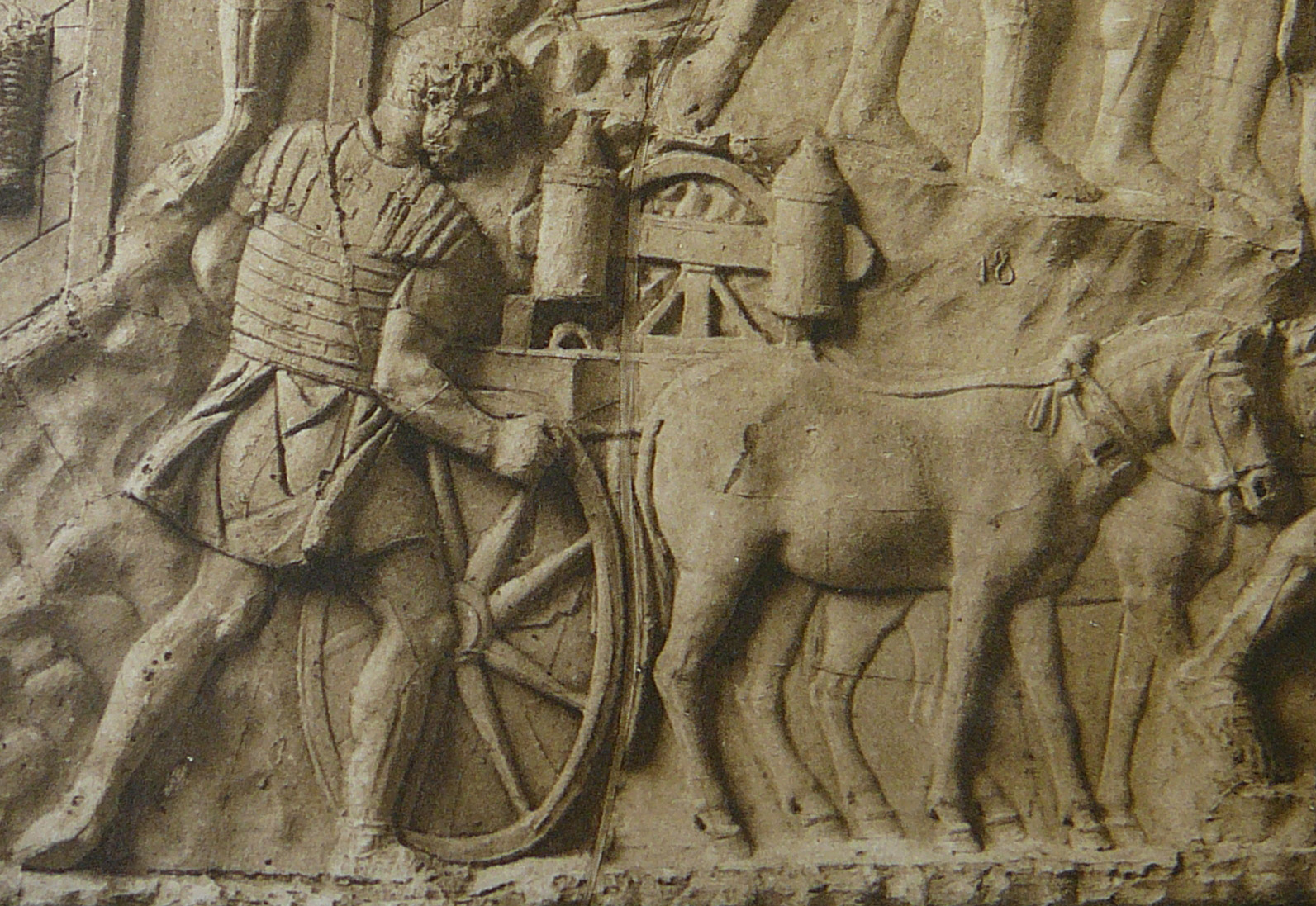
Roman carroballista on Trajan's Column

The Romans obtained their knowledge of artillery from the Greeks. In ancient Roman tradition, women were supposed to have given up their hair for use in catapults, which has a later example in Carthage in 148-146 BC. Torsion artillery, especially ballistas came into heavy usage during the First Punic War and was so common by the Second Punic War that Plautus remarked in the Captivi that “Meus est ballista pugnus, cubitus catapulta est mihi” (“The ballista is my fist, the catapult is my elbow").

By 100 AD, the Romans had begun to permanently mount artillery, whereas previously machines had traveled largely disassembled in carts. Romans made the Greek ballista more portable, calling the hand-held version manuballista and the cart-mounted type carroballista. They also made use of a one armed torsion stone-projector named the onager. The earliest extant evidence of the carroballista is on Trajan's Column. Between 100 and 300 AD, every Roman legion had a battery of ten onagers and 55 cheiroballistas hauled by teams of mules. After this, there were legionaries called ballistarii whose exclusive purpose was to produce, move, and maintain catapults.

In later antiquity the onager began to replace the more complicated two-armed devices. The Greeks and Romans, with advanced methods of military supply and armament, were able to readily produce the many pieces needed to build a ballista. In the later 4th and 5th centuries as these administrative structures began to change, simpler devices became preferable because the technical skills needed to produce more complex machines were no longer as common. Vegetius, Ammianus Marcellinus, and the anonymous "De rebus bellicis" are our first and most descriptive sources on torsion machines, all writing in the 4th century AD. A little later, in the 6th century, Procopius provides his description of torsion devices. All use the term ballistas and provide descriptions similar to those of their predecessors.

=== Medieval continuity ===
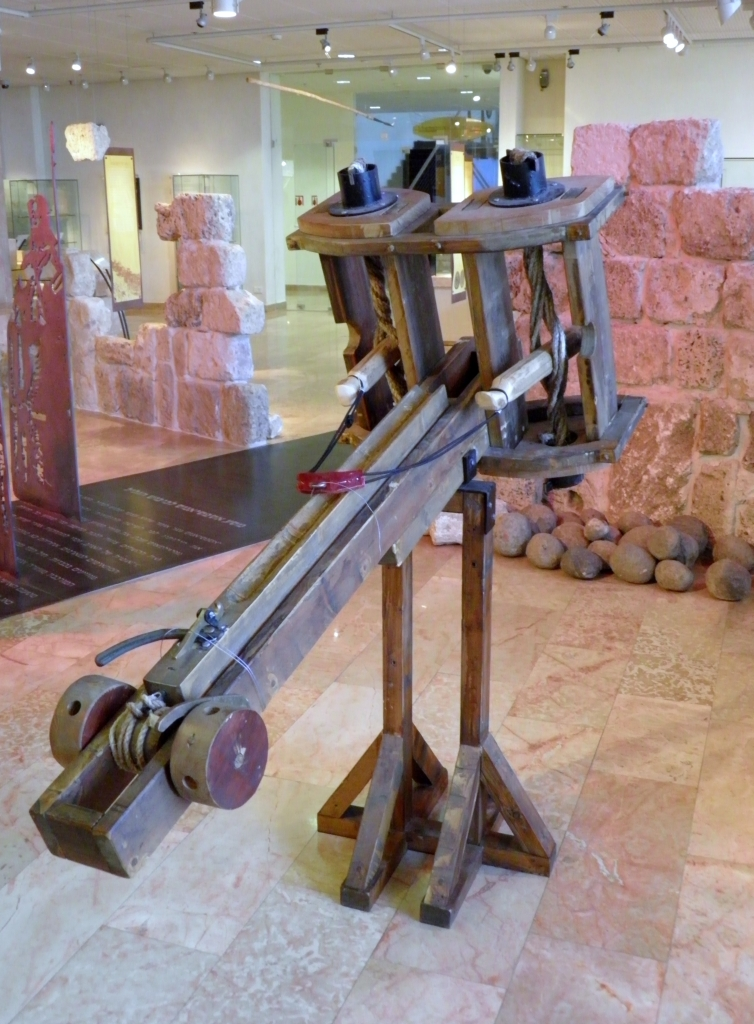
Ballista

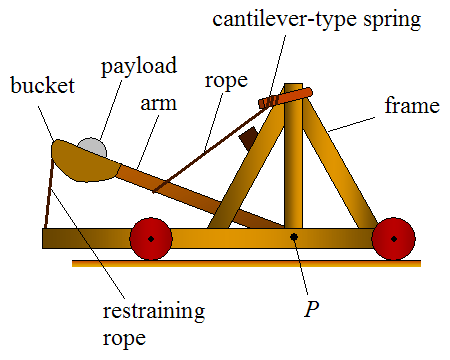
Bucket onager (4th-6th century torsion weapon)

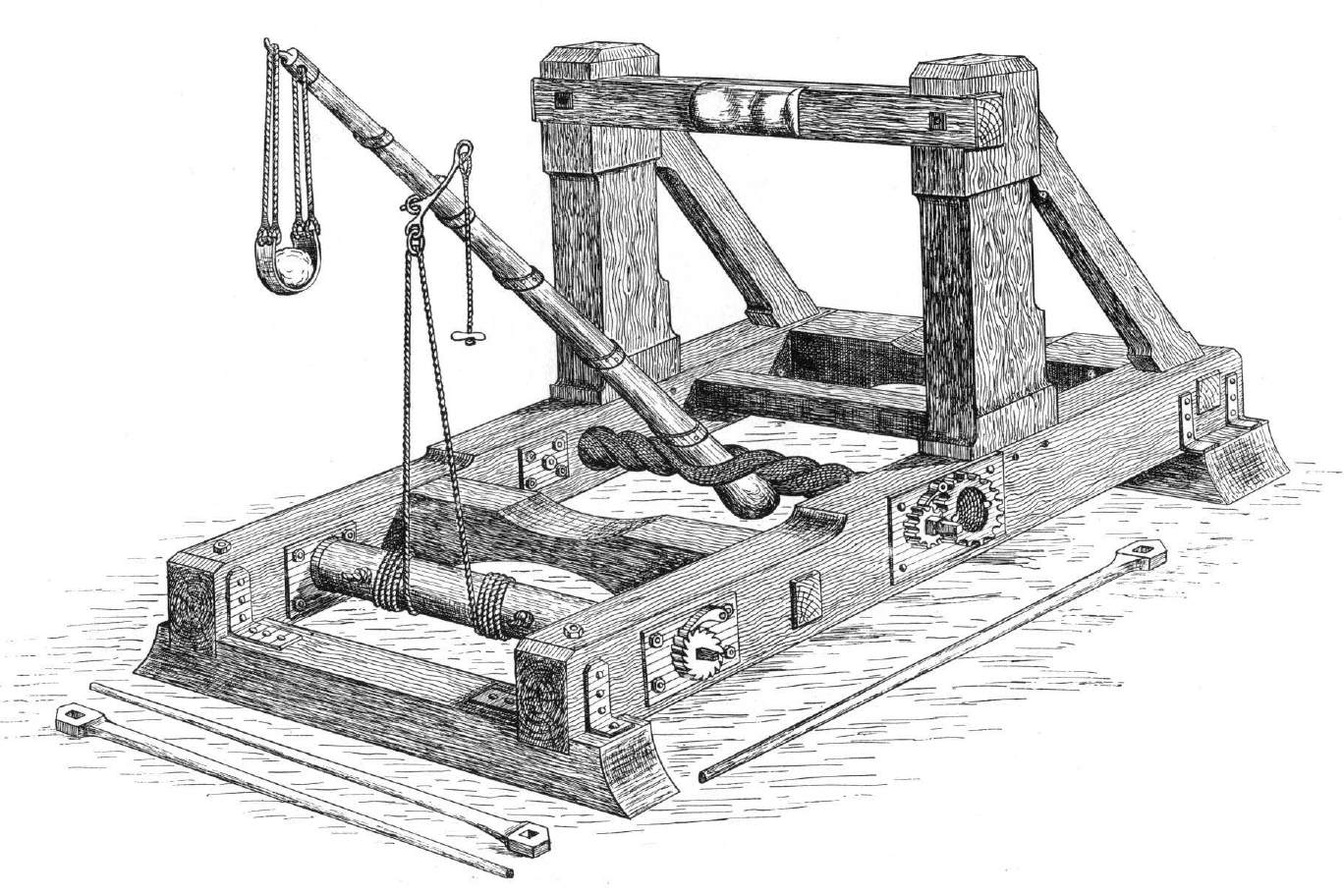
Sling onager - the sling version improved on the bucket by increasing arm length without burdening the arm with extra weight

A common misconception about torsion siege engines such as the ballista or onager is their continued usage after the beginning of the Early Middle Ages (late 5th-10th centuries AD). These artillery weapons were only used in the West until the 6-8th centuries, when they were replaced by the traction trebuchet, more commonly known as the mangonel. The myth of the torsion mangonel began in the 18th century when Francis Grose claimed that the onager was the dominant medieval artillery until the arrival of gunpowder. In the mid-19th century, Guillaume Henri Dufour adjusted this framework by arguing that onagers went out of use in medieval times, but were directly replaced by the counterweight trebuchet. Dufour and Louis-Napoléon Bonaparte argued that torsion machines were abandoned because the requisite supplies needed to build the sinew skein and metal support pieces were too difficult to obtain in comparison to the materials needed for tension and counterweight machines. In the early 20th century, Sir Ralph Payne-Gallwey concurred that torsion catapults were not used in medieval times, but only owing to their greater complexity, and believed that they were superior to "such a clumsy engine as the medieval trebuchet." Others such as General Köhler disagreed and argued that torsion machines were used throughout the Middle Ages. The torsion mangonel myth is particularly appealing for many historians due to its potential as an argument for the continuity of classical technologies and scientific knowledge into the Early Middle Ages, which they use to refute the concept of medieval decline.

It was only in 1910 that Rudolph Schneider pointed out that medieval Latin texts are completely devoid of any description of the torsion mechanism. He proposed that all medieval terms for artillery actually referred to the trebuchet, and that the knowledge to build torsion engines had been lost since classical times. In 1941, Kalervo Huuri argued that the onager remained in use in the Mediterranean region, but not ballistas, until the 7th century when "its employment became obscured in the terminology as the traction trebuchet came into use."

Some historians such as Randall Rogers and Bernard Bachrach have argued that the lack of evidence regarding torsion siege engines does not provide enough proof that they were not used, considering that the narrative accounts of these machines almost always do not provide enough information to definitively identify the type of device being described, even with illustrations. However, by the 9th century, when the first Western European reference to a mangana (mangonel) appeared, there is virtually no evidence at all, whether textual or artistic, of torsion engines used in warfare. The last historical texts specifying a torsion engine, aside from bolt throwers such as the springald, date no later than the 6th century. Illustrations of an onager do not reappear until the 15th century. With the exception of bolt throwers such as the springald which saw action from the 13th to 14th centuries or the ziyar in the Muslim world, torsion machines had largely disappeared by the 6th century and were replaced by the traction trebuchet. This does not mean torsion machines were completely forgotten since classical texts describing them were circulated in medieval times. For example, Geoffrey Plantagenet, Count of Anjou had a copy of Vegetius at the siege of Montreuil-Bellay in 1147, yet judging from the description of the siege, the weapon they used was a traction trebuchet rather than a torsion catapult.

... anyone consulting Bradbury’s Routledge Companion to Medieval Warfare (2004) will find mangonels described as stone-throwing catapults powered by the torsion effect of twisted ropes... But the truth is that there is no evidence for its medieval existence at all. Of course, it is hard to prove that something was not there (as opposed to proving that something was), but this is not a new finding: a considerable body of learned research dating back to the 19th century had reached that conclusion. But it has not stopped the transmission of the myth to the present day.

In the enormous quantity of surviving illuminated manuscripts, the illustrations have always given us valuable clues about warfare. In all this mass of illustrations, there are numerous depictions of manually operated stone throwers, then of trebuchets and, finally, of bombards and other types of weapon and siege equipment. Taking into consideration the constraints under which the monastic artists were working, and their purpose (which was not, of course, to provide a scientifically precise depiction of a particular siege), such illustrations are often remarkably accurate. Not once, however, is there an illustration of the onager. Unless there was some extraordinary global conspiracy to deny the existence of such weapons, one can only conclude that they were unknown to medieval clerics.

There is no evidence whatever for the continuation of the onager in Byzantium beyond the end of the 6th century, while its absence in the ‘barbarian’ successor kingdoms can be shown, negatively, by the absence of any reference and, logically, from the decline in the expertise needed to build, maintain and use the machine. When the mangonel appeared in Europe from the east (initially in the Byzantine world), it was a traction-propelled stone thrower. Torsion power went out of use for some seven centuries before returning in the guise of the bolt-throwing springald, deployed not as an offensive, wallbreaking siege engine, but to defend those walls against human assailants.

— Peter Purton

Contributing to the torsion mangonel myth is the muddled usage of the term mangonel. Mangonel was used as a general medieval catch-all for stone throwing artillery, which probably meant a traction trebuchet from the 6th to 12th centuries, between the disappearance of the onager and the arrival of the counterweight trebuchet. However many historians have argued for the continued use of onagers into medieval times by wading into terminological thickets. For example, at the end of the 19th century, Gustav Köhler contended that the petrary was a traction trebuchet, invented by Muslims, whereas the mangonel was a torsion catapult. Even disregarding definition, sometimes when the original source specifically used the word "mangonel," it was translated as a torsion weapon such as the ballista instead, which was the case with an 1866 Latin translation of a Welsh text. This further adds to the confusion in terminology since "ballista" was used in medieval times as well, but probably only as a general term for stone throwing machines. For example Otto of Freising referred to the mangonel as a type of ballista, by which he meant they both threw stones. There are also references to Arabs, Saxons, and Franks using ballistas but it is never specified whether or not these were torsion machines. It is stated that during the siege of Paris in 885–886, when Rollo pitted his forces against Charles the Fat, seven Danes were impaled at once with a bolt from a funda. Even in this instance it is never stated that the machine was torsion, as was the case with uses of other terminology such as mangana by William of Tyre and Willam the Breton, used to indicate small stone-throwing engines, or "cum cornu" ("with horns") in 1143 by Jacques de Vitry.

The best arguments for the continued use of torsion artillery in Europe after the sixth century are the continued use of classical terms and the lack of conclusive evidence that they were not used; but neither of these arguments is particularly strong. Such engines were less powerful, more complicated, and far more dangerous to operate than swing-beam engines, given the pent-up stresses within the coil and then violent stop of the arm against a component of the framework when fired. Traction trebuchets, by comparison, were capable of a much higher rate of fire and were far simpler to construct, use and maintain.

— Michael S. Fulton

In modern times the mangonel is often confused with the onager due to the torsion mangonel myth. Modern military historians came up with the term "traction trebuchet" to distinguish it from previous torsion machines such as the onager. However traction trebuchet is a newer modern term that is not found in contemporary sources, which can lead to further confusion. For some, the mangonel is not a specific type of siege weapon but a general term for any pre-cannon stone throwing artillery. Onagers have been called onager mangonels and traction trebuchets called "beam-sling mangonel machines". From a practical perspective, mangonel has been used to describe anything from a torsion engine like the onager, to a traction trebuchet, to a counterweight trebuchet depending on the user's bias.

== Construction ==
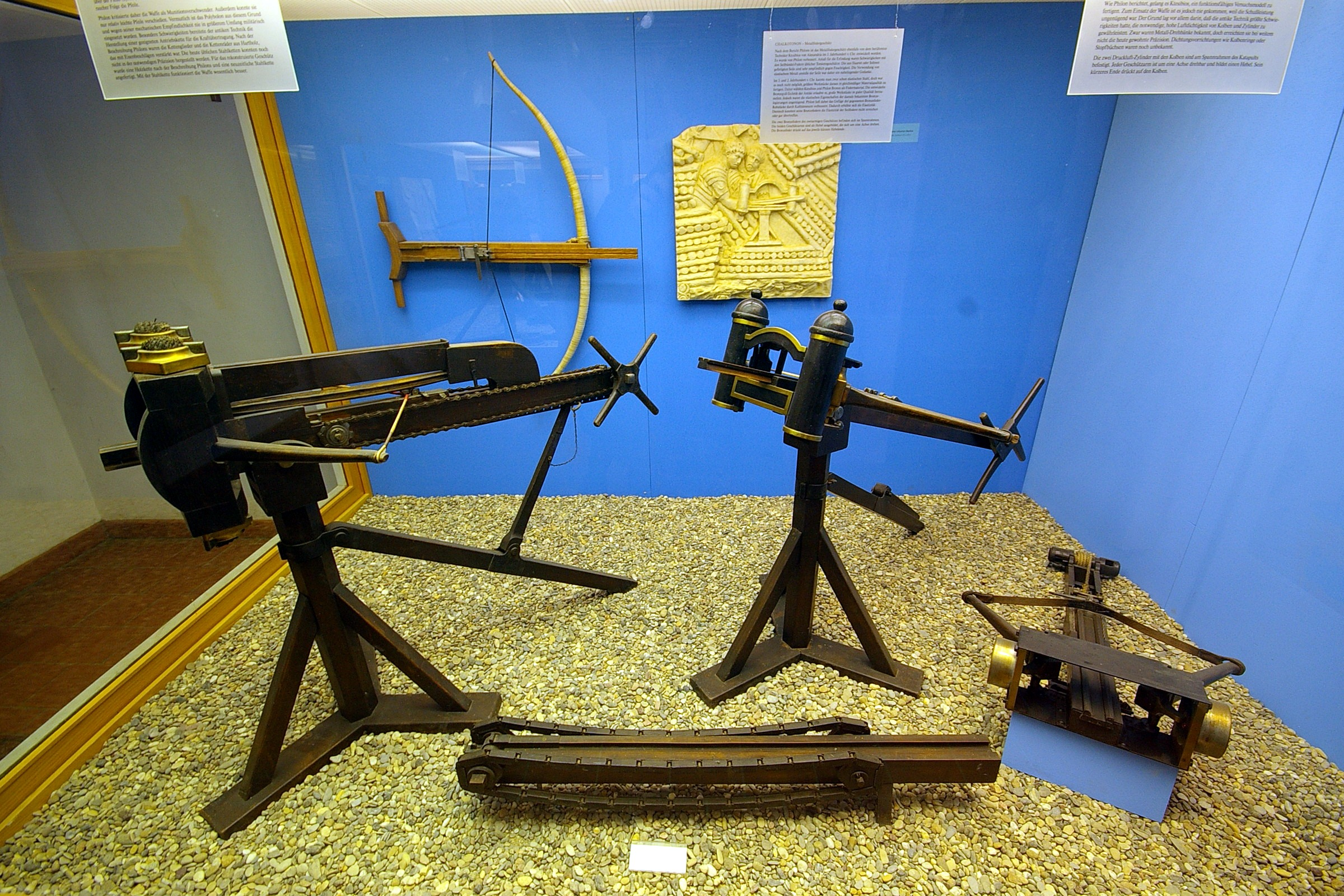
Reproductions of ancient Greek artillery, including catapults such as the polybolos (to the left in the foreground) and a large, early crossbow known as the gastraphetes (mounted on the wall in the background)

=== Design ===
In early designs, machines were made with square wooden frames with holes drilled in the top and bottom through which a skein was threaded, wrapped around wooden levers that spanned the holes, enabling the adjustment of tension. The problem with this design is that when increasing the tension of the skein, turning the lever became nigh impossible because of the friction caused by the contact made between the wood of the lever and the wood of the frame. This problem was solved simply with the addition of metal washers inserted in the holes of the frames and fastened either with tenons or rims which enabled greater control over the machine's tension and the maximization of its power without sacrificing the integrity of the frame. Further design modifications that became standard include combining the two separate spring frames into a single unit to increase durability and stability, the addition of a padded heel block to stop the recoil of the machine, the development of formulae to determine the appropriate engine size (see Construction & Measurements below), and a ratcheting trigger mechanism that made it quicker to fire the machine. Marsden suggests that all of these initial developments occurred in fairly rapid succession, potentially over the span of just a few decades, because the deficiencies in design were fairly obvious problems. Thereon, a gradual refinement over the succeeding centuries provided the adjustments given in the chart below. Marsden's description of torsion machine development follows the general course that Heron of Alexandria lays out, but the Greek writer does not give any dates, either. Marsden's chart below gives his best approximations of the dates of machine development.

Machine Type	Main Improvement	Authority	Date
Mark I, arrow-firer	pair of simple spring-frames and wrapped-above-torsion-springs	Heron	c. 350 BC
Mark II, arrow-firer	spring-frames with holes	Heron	before 340 BC
Mark III, arrow-firer	usage of washers	Heron	after 340 BC
Mark IIIa, arrow-firer	increased angle between the extreme positions of the arms	Philon	before 334 BC
Mark IIIb, stone-projector	increased angle between the extreme positions of the arms	Philon	b/t 334 & 331 BC
Mark IVa, arrow-firer	built according to formula for arrow-firers	Heron/Philon	c. 270 BC
Mark IVb, stone-projector	built according to formula for stone-projectors	Heron/Philon	c. 270 BC
Modified Mark IVa, arrow firer	curved arms	Vitruvius	c. 150 BC
Mark Va, arrow-firer	oval washers	Vitruvius	c. 60 BC
Mark Vb, stone-projector	oval washers	Vitruvius	c. 60 BC
cheiroballista	all-metal frames, arch-shaped sighting device, an even larger angle between the extreme positions of the arms	Trajan's Column	c. 100 AD

Only a few specific designs of torsion catapults are known from ancient and medieval history. The materials used are just as vague, other than stating wood or metal were used as building materials. The skein that comprised the spring, on the other hand, has been cited specifically as made of both animal sinew and hair, either women's and horse. Heron and Vegetius consider sinew to be better, but Vitruvius cites women's hair as preferable. The preferred type of sinews came from the feet of deer (assumedly achilles tendons because they were longest) and the necks of oxen (strong from constant yoking). How it was made into a rope is not known, though J.G. Landels argues it was likely frayed on the ends, then woven together. The ropes, either hair or sinew were treated with olive oil and animal grease/fat to preserve its elasticity. Landels additionally argues that the energy-storing capacity of sinew is much greater than a wooden beam or bow, especially considering that wood's performance in tension devices is severely affected by temperatures above 77 °F (25 °C), which was not uncommon in a Mediterranean climate.

=== Measurements ===
Two general formulas were used in determining the size of the machine and the projectile it throws. The first is to determine the length of the bolt for a sharp-thrower, given as d = x / 9, where d is the diameter of the hole in the frame where the skein was threaded and x is the length of the bolt to be thrown. The second formula is for a stone thrower, given as $d = (1.1)100m^{1/3}$, where d is the diameter of the hole in the frame where the skein was threaded and m is the weight of the stone. The reason for the development of these formulas is to maximize the potential energy of the skein. If it was too long, the machine could not be used at its full capacity. Furthermore, if it was too short, the skein produced a high amount of internal friction that would reduce the durability of the machine. Finally, being able to accurately determine the diameter of the frame's holes prevented the sinews and fibers of the skein from being damaged by the wood of the frame. Once these initial measurements were made, corollary formulae could be used to determine the dimensions of the rest of the machines. A couple of examples below serve to illustrate this:

Length/Weight of Missile	Diameter of torsion spring	Height of torsion spring	Machine length	Machine width
31 cm (12 in)	3.4 cm (1.3 in)	22.1 cm (8.7 in)	Hand-held	Hand-held
54 cm (21 in)	5.6 cm (2.2 in)	36.4 cm (14.3 in)	1.4 m (4 ft 7 in)	0.8 m (2 ft 7 in)
54 cm (21 in)	6 cm (2.4 in)	39 cm (15 in)	1.5 m (4 ft 11 in)	0.9 m (2 ft 11 in)
69 cm (27 in)	7.5 cm (3.0 in)	48.8 cm (19.2 in)	1.9 m (6 ft 3 in)	1.1 m (3 ft 7 in)
77 cm (30 in)	8.3 cm (3.3 in)	54 cm (21 in)	2.1 m (6 ft 11 in)	1.2 m (3 ft 11 in)
77 cm (30 in)	8.4 cm (3.3 in)	54.6 cm (21.5 in)	2.1 m (6 ft 11 in)	1.2 m (3 ft 11 in)
123 cm (48 in)	13.6 cm (5.4 in)	88.4 cm (34.8 in)	3.4 m (11 ft)	1.9 m (6 ft 3 in)
10 minas	21.2 cm (8.3 in)	1.91 m (6 ft 3 in)	6.4 m (21 ft)	3.2 m (10 ft)
15 minas	24.3 cm (9.6 in)	2.19 m (7 ft 2 in)	7.3 m (24 ft)	3.6 m (12 ft)
20 minas	26.8 cm (10.6 in)	2.41 m (7 ft 11 in)	8 m (26 ft)	4 m (13 ft)
30 minas	30.7 cm (12.1 in)	2.76 m (9 ft 1 in)	9.2 m (30 ft)	4.6 m (15 ft)
50 minas	36.3 cm (14.3 in)	3.27 m (10.7 ft)	10.9 m (36 ft)	5.4 m (18 ft)
1 talent	38.4 cm (15.1 in)	3.46 m (11.4 ft)	11.5 m (38 ft)	5.8 m (19 ft)
2 talents	48.6 cm (19.1 in)	4.37 m (14.3 ft)	14.6 m (48 ft)	7.3 m (24 ft)

d is measured in dactyls , and 1 dactyl = 1.93 cm (0.76 in)

m is measured in minas, and 1 mina = 437 g (15.4 oz)

1 talent = 60 mina = 26 kg (57 lb)

=== Effective use ===
No definitive results have been obtained through documentation or experiment that can accurately verify claims made in manuscripts concerning the range and damaging capabilities of torsion machines. The only way to do so would be to construct a whole range of full-scale devices using period techniques and supplies to test the legitimacy of individual design specifications and their effectiveness of their power. Kelly DeVries and Serafina Cuomo claim torsion engines needed to be about 150 m (490 ft) or closer to their target to be effective, though this is based on literary evidence, too. Athenaeus Mechanicus cites a three-span catapult that could propel a shot 700 yd (640 m). Josephus cites an engine that could hurl a stone ball 400 yd (370 m) or more, and Marsden claims that most engines were probably effective up to the distance cited by Josephus, with more powerful machines capable of going farther. Of the projectiles used, exceptionally large ones have been mentioned in accounts, but "most Hellenistic projectiles found in the Near East weigh less than 15 kg (33 lb) and most dating to the Roman period weigh less than 5 kg (11 lb)."

The obvious disadvantage to any device powered primarily by animal tissue is that they had the potential to deteriorate rapidly and be severely affected by changing weather. Another issue was that the rough surface of the wooden frames could easily damage the sinew of the skein, and on the other hand the force of the tension provided by the skein could potentially damage the wooden frame. The solution was to place washers inside the holes of the frame through which the skein was threaded. This prevented damage to the skein, increased the structural integrity of the frame, and allowed engineers to precisely adjust tension levels using evenly spaced holes on the outer rim of the washers. The skein itself could be made out of human or animal hair, but it was most commonly made out of animal sinew, which Heron cites specifically. Life of the sinew has been estimated to be about eight to ten years, which made them expensive to maintain.

What is known is that they were used to provide covering fire while the attacking army was assaulting a fortification, filling in a ditch, and bringing other siege engines up to walls. Jim Bradbury goes so far as to claim torsion engines were only useful against personnel, primarily because medieval torsion devices were not powerful enough to batter down walls.

== Archaeological evidence ==
Archaeological evidence for catapults, especially torsion devices, is rare. It is easy to see how stones from stone-throwers could survive, but organic sinews and wooden frames quickly deteriorate if left unattended. Usual remains include the all-important washers, as well as other metal supporting pieces, such as counterplates and trigger mechanisms. Still, the first major evidence of ancient or medieval catapults was found in 1912 in Ampurias. It was not until 1968-1969 that new catapult finds were discovered at Gornea and Orşova, then again in 1972 in Hatra, with more frequent discoveries thereafter.

=== Stone projectiles ===
The sites below contained stone projectiles ranging in size from 10 to 90 minas (c. 4.5–39 kg (9.9–86.0 lb)).

- 5,600 balls in Carthage (Tunisia)
- 961 balls in Pergamum (Turkey)
- 353 balls in Rhodes (Greece)
- >200 balls in Tel Dor (Israel)
- c. 200 balls in Salamis (Cyprus)

=== Catapult remains ===
NOTE: This list is not meant to be comprehensive. It is meant to show the widespread use of catapults in the Western world.

Location	Frame Material	Date	Washer amt. & avg. diameter: millimeters (inches)
Ampurias (Spain)	Wood	c. 100 BC	4 x 81 mm (3.2 in)
Auerberg (Germany)	Wood	c. 75 AD	1 x 88 mm (3.5 in)
Azaila #1 (Spain)	Wood	c. 80 BC	1 x 94 mm (3.7 in)
Azaila #2	Wood	c. 80 BC	1 x 94 mm (3.7 in) (est. from frame remains)
Azaila #3	Wood	c. 80 BC	1 x 100 mm (3.9 in) (est. from counter-plate)
Bath (United Kingdom)	Wood	c. 100 AD	1 x 38 mm (1.5 in)
Caminreal (Spain)	Wood	c. 75 BC	4 x 84 mm (3.3 in)
Cremona #1 (Italy)	Wood	c. 69 AD	4 x 73 mm (2.9 in)
Cremona #2	Wood	c. 69 AD	4 x 89 mm (3.5 in)
Elginhaugh (United Kingdom)	Wood	c. 90 AD	1 x 35 mm (1.4 in) (ratchet found, too)
Ephyra #1 (Greece)	Wood	c. 169 BC	2 x 84 mm (3.3 in)
Ephyra #2	Wood	c. 169 BC	3 x 83 mm (3.3 in)
Ephyra #3	Wood	c. 169 BC	4 x 136 mm (5.4 in)
Ephyra #4	Wood	c. 169 BC	4 x 61 mm (2.4 in)
Ephyra #5	Wood	c. 167 BC	2 x 75 mm (3.0 in)
Ephyra #6	Wood	c. 167 BC	1 x 34 mm (1.3 in)
Ephyra #7	Wood	c. 167 BC	2 x 56 mm (2.2 in)
Gornea #1 (Romania)	Metal	c. 380 AD	2 x 54 mm (2.1 in)
Gornea #2	Metal	c. 380 AD	2 x 59 mm (2.3 in)
Gornea #3	Metal	c. 380 AD	2 x 54 mm (2.1 in)
Hatra #1 (Iraq)	Wood	c. 241 AD	3 x 160 mm (6.3 in)
Hatra #2	Wood	c. 241 AD	
Lyon (France)	Metal	c. 197 AD	2 x 75 mm (3.0 in)
Mahdia #1 (Tunisia)	Wood	c. 60 BC	2 x 94 mm (3.7 in)
Mahdia #2	Wood	c. 60 BC	1 x 72 mm (2.8 in)
Mahdia #3	Wood	c. 60 BC	1 x 45 mm (1.8 in)
Orşova (Romania)	Metal	c. 380 AD	2 x 79 mm (3.1 in)
Pergamon (Turkey)	Wood	c. 2nd century BC	1 x 60 mm (2.4 in) (mystery bracing also found)
Pityous (Georgia)	Wood	c. 4th century AD	1 x 84 mm (3.3 in)
Sala	Metal	c. 4th century AD	c. 80 mm (3.1 in) (cast in one piece)
Sounion (Greece)	Wood	c. 260 BC	130 mm (5.1 in) (lost)
Tanais (Ukraine)	Unknown	c. 50 BC?	
Volubilis #1 (Morocco)	Wood	c. 2nd-3rd century AD	1 x 41 mm (1.6 in)
Volubilis #2	Wood	c. 2nd-3rd century AD	1 x 44 mm (1.7 in)
Xanten (Germany)	Wood	c. 1st century AD	4 x c. 40 mm (1.6 in) (diameter estimated from frame)

== Literary evidence ==
The literary examples of torsion machines are too numerous to cite here. Below are a few well-known examples to provide a general perspective held by contemporaries.

=== Examples ===
Diodorus of Sicily, History, 14.42.1, 43.3., 50.4, c. 30 - 60 BC

"As a matter of fact, the catapult was invented at this time [399 BC] in Syracuse, for the greatest technical minds from all over had been assembled in one place...The Syracusans killed many of their enemies by shooting them from the land with catapults that shot sharp-pointed missiles. In fact this piece of artillery caused great consternation, since it had not been known before this time."

Josephus, The Wars of the Jews, 67 AD

"The force with which these weapons threw stones and darts was such that a single projectile ran through a row of men, and the momentum of the stone hurled by the engine carried away battlements and knocked off corners of towers. There is in fact no body of men so strong that it cannot be laid low to the last rank by the impact of these huge stones...Getting in the line of fire, one of the men standing near Josephus [the commander of Jotapata, not the historian] on the rampart had his head knocked off by a stone, his skull being flung like a pebble from a sling more than 600 m (2,000 ft); and when a pregnant woman on leaving her house at daybreak was struck in the belly, the unborn child was carried away 100 m (330 ft)."

Procopius, The Wars of Justinian, 537-538 AD

"...at the Salerian Gate a Goth of goodly statue and a capable warrior, wearing a corselet and having a helmet on his head, a man who was of no mean station in the Gothic nation...was hit by a missile from an engine which was on a tower at this left. And passing through the corselet and the body of the man, the missile sank more than half its length into the tree, and pinning him to the spot where it entered the tree, it suspended him there a corpse."

=== Images ===
==== Manuscripts ====
1. Espringal from the anonymous Romance of Alexander, c. 14th century, MS Bodleian 264.
2. Espringal from De re militari by Roberto Valturio, 1455.
3. Mangonel from BL Royal 19 D I, f.111.
4. Onager from Walter de Milemete's De nobilitatibus, sapientiis, et prudentiis regum, 1326.]

==== Iconography ====
1. Cheiroballista behind fortifications, Trajan's Column, 1st century AD
2. Cheiroballista, mounted on wall, Trajan's Column.
3. Cheiroballista hauled by horse, Trajan's Column.
4. Bronze Washers from the Amparius catatpult, cited in Schramm.

==== Diagrams ====
One-Armed Machines

1. Catapult with bucket.
2. Catapult with sling.
3. Onager.

Two-Armed Machines

1. Ballista.
2. Euthytonon.
3. Euthytonon range of movement.
4. Oxybolos.
5. Palintonon.
6. Palintonon side view.
7. Scorpion.
8. Stone Thrower.

==== Reproductions ====
One-Armed Machines

1. Catapult at the Stratford Armouries, Warwickshire, England.
2. Onager at Felsenburg Neurathen, Saxony.

Two-Armed Machine

1. Ballista at Caerphilly Castle, Wales.
2. Ballista at Warwick Castle, England.
3. Cheiroballista.
4. Espringal side view and rear view.
5. Polybolos & cheiroballista. Arsenal of ancient mechanical artillery in the Saalburg, Germany. Reconstructions made by the German engineer Erwin Schramm (1856–1935) in 1912.
6. Roman Ballista in the Hecht Museum, Haifa.
7. Roman Ballista.
8. Zayir at Trebuchet Park, Albarracín, Spain.

=== Terminology ===
There is controversy over the terminology used to describe siege engines of every kind, including torsion machines. It is frustrating to scholars because the manuscripts are both vague in their descriptions of the machines and inconsistent in their usage of the terms. Additionally, in those few instances where torsion engines are identifiable, it is never certain which specific type of machine is being cited. Some scholars argue this abundance of terms indicates that torsion devices were in widespread use during the Middle Ages, though others argue that it is this very confusion about machine terminology that proves the few ancient texts that survived in the Latin West did not provide adequate information for the continuation of ancient torsion machines. The list below provides terms that have been found in reference to torsion engines in the ancient and medieval eras, but their specific definitions are largely inconclusive.

algarradas ("bull headed")	fonevola ("volatile spring"?)	oxybolos ("sharp thrower")
ballista	funa (thong of a sling)	palestra ("stake caster"?)
ballista fulminalis ("lightning ballista")	fundibula (sling)	palintonos ("fold back spring")
brigoles	lithobolos ("stone thrower")	pararia (lit. "the equalizer")
calibres	katapeltes	patera
carroballista (see cheiroballista)	machina ("machine")	paterells
catapulta ("shield breaker")	mangana	peralia
chaabla	mangonellus (see mangana)	petraria
chatcotonus ("bronze spring")	mangonon (see mangana)	petrobolos ("stone thrower")
cheiroballista ("hand ballista")	manjanîq	polybolos ("multi-thrower")
cum cornu ("with horn")	manuballista ("hand ballista")	scorpio
espringal	monagkon	tormentum
euthytonos ("straight-spring")	onager ("wild ass")	ziyar, qaws al-ziyar

== Bibliography ==
Primary Sources

(see also External links below)

- Humphrey, J.W., J.P. Olson, and A.N. Sherwood. Greek and Roman Technology: A Sourcebook. London: Routledge, 1998.
- Fulton, Michael S. (2016), Artillery in and around the Latin East
- Marsden, E.W. Greek and Roman Artillery: Technical Treatises. Oxford: Clarendon Press, 1971.
- Needham, Joseph (2004). Science and Civilization in China. Cambridge University Press. p. 218.
- Needham, Joseph (1986). Science and Civilization in China: Volume 4, Part 2. Taipei: Caves Books, Ltd.
- Needham, Joseph (1994), Science and Civilization in China 5-6
- Nicolle, David (2002), Medieval Siege Weapons 1, Osprey Publishing
- Philon of Byzantium. Philons Belopoiika (viertes Buch der Mechanik). Berlin: Verlag der Aakademie der Wissenschaften, 1919.
- Purton, Peter (2006), The myth of the mangonel: torsion artillery in the Middle Ages
- Purton, Peter (2009), A History of the Early Medieval Siege c.450-1200, The Boydell Press
- Vitruvius. On Architecture. Accessed April 28, 2013. Book X, §10.

Secondary sources

- Baatz, Dietwulf. “Recent Finds of Ancient Artillery.” Britannia, 9 (1978): 1–17.
- Bachrach, Bernard S. “Medieval Siege Warfare: A Reconnaissance.” The Journal of Military History, 58 #1 (January 1994): 119–133.
- Bradbury, Jim. The Medieval Siege. Woodbridge, Suffolk: The Boydell Press, 1992.
- Chevedden, Paul E. “Artillery in Late Antiquity: Prelude to the Middle Ages,” in The Medieval City under Siege, edited by Ivy A. Corfis and Michael Wolfe, pp. 131–176. Woodbridge, Suffolk: The Boydell Press, 1995.
- Cuomo, Serafina. “The Sinews of War: Ancient Catapults.” Science, New Series, 303 #5659 (February 6, 2004): 771–772.
- DeVries, Kelly. Medieval Military Technology. Ontario: Broadview Press, 1992.
- DeVries, Kelly & Robert D. Smith. Medieval Weapons: An Illustrated History of their Impact. Santa Barbara, CA: ABC-CLIO, Inc, 2007.
- Dufour, Guillaume. Mémoire sur l’artillerie des anciens et sur celle de Moyen Âge. Paris: Ab. Cherbuliez et Ce,1840).
- Fulton, Michael S. (2018), Artillery in the Era of the Crusades
- Gravett, Christophers. Medieval Siege Warfare. Oxford: Osprey Publishing, Ltd, 1990, 2003.
- Hacker, Barton C. “Greek Catapults and Catapult Technology: Science, Technology, and War in the Ancient World.” Technology and Culture, 9 #1 (January 1968): 34–50.
- Huuri, Kalervo. “Zur Geschichte de mittelalterlichen Geschützwesens aus orientalischen Quellen,” in Societas Orientalia Fennica, Studia Orientalia 9.3 (1941): pp. 50–220.
- Johnson, Stephen. Late Roman Fortifications. Totowa, NJ: Barnes & Noble Books, 1983.
- Köhler, G. Die Entwickelung des Kriegwesens und der Kriegfürung in der Ritterseit von Mitte des II. Jahrhundert bis du Hussitenkriegen, Vol. 3. Breslau: Verlag von Wilhelm Koebner, 1890.
- Landels, J.G. Engineering in the Ancient World. Berkeley: University of California Press, 1978.
- Marsden, E.W. Greek and Roman Artillery: Historical Development. Oxford: Clarendon Press, 1969.
- Nicholson, Helen. Medieval Warfare: Theory and Practice of War in Europe, 300-1500. New York: Palgrave Macmillan, 2004.
- Nossov, Konstantin. Ancient and Medieval Siege Weapons: A Fully Illustrated Guide to Siege Weapons and Tactics. Guilford, CT: The Lyons Press, 2005.
- Reinschmidt, Kenneth F. “Catapults of Yore.” Science, New Series, 304 #5675 (May 28, 2004): 1247.
- Rihill, Tracey. The Catapult: A History. Yardley, PA: Wesholme Publishing, LLC, 2007.
- Rihill, Tracey. “On Artillery Towers and Catapult Sizes.” The Annual of the British School at Athens, 101 (2006): 379–383.
- Rogers, Randall. Latin Siege Warfare in the Twelfth Century. Oxford: Oxford University Press, 1992.
- Roland, Alex. “Science, Technology, and War.” Technology and Culture, 36 #2, Supplement: Snapshots of a Discipline: Selected Proceedings from the Conference on Critical Problems and Research Frontiers in the History of Technology, Madison, Wisconsin, October 30-November 3, 1991 (April 1995): S83-100.
- Schneider, Rudolf. Die Artillerie des Mittelalters. Berlin: Weidmannsche Buchhandlung, 1910.
- Tarver, W.T.S. “The Traction Trebuchet: A Reconstruction of an Early Medieval Siege Engine.” Technology and Culture, 36 #1 (January 1995): 136–167.
- Thompson, E.A. “Early Germanic Warfare.” Past and Present, 14 (November 1958): 2-29.
