= Mangonel =

Human-powered trebuchet

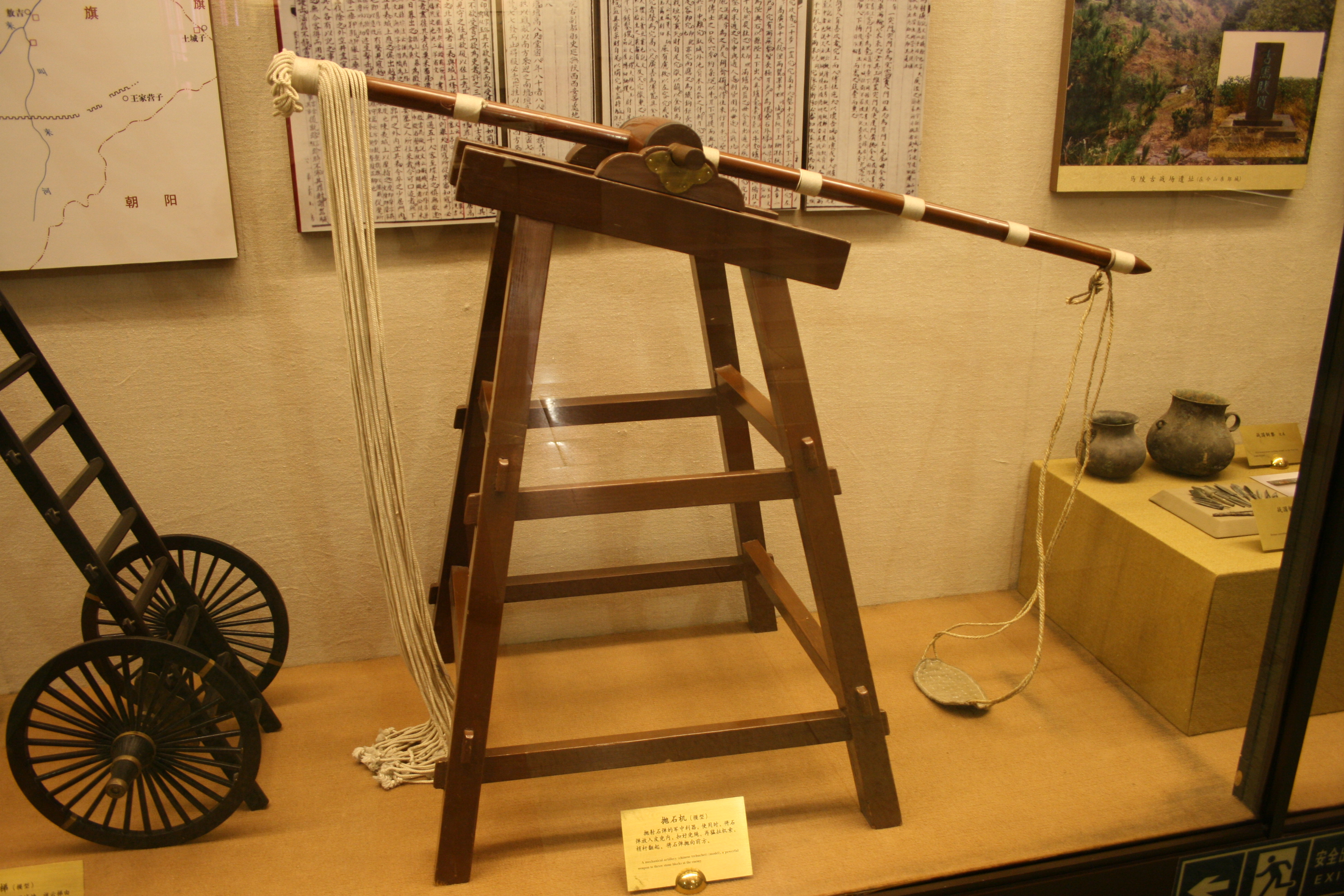
Miniature model of a Chinese mangonel (traction trebuchet)

The mangonel, also called the traction trebuchet, is a type of trebuchet that was used in Ancient China starting in the Warring States period and later across Eurasia by the 6th century AD. Unlike the later counterweight trebuchet, the mangonel was operated by people pulling ropes attached to one end of a lever, the other end of which had a sling to launch projectiles.

Although the mangonel required more men to function, it was also less complex and faster to reload than the torsion-powered onager which it replaced in early Medieval Europe. It was replaced as the primary siege weapon in the 12th and 13th centuries by the counterweight trebuchet. A common misconception about the mangonel is that it was a torsion siege engine.

== Etymology ==
The word mangonel was first attested in English in the 13th century; it is borrowed from Old French mangonel, mangonelle (> French mangonneau). The French word is from Medieval Latin manganellus, mangonellus, diminutive form of Late Latin manganum, itself probably derived from the Greek mangana, "a generic term for construction machinery." or mágganon "engine of war, axis of a pulley"

Mangonel was a general term for medieval stone-throwing artillery and was used more specifically to refer to manually (traction--) powered weapons. It is sometimes wrongly used to refer to the onager. Modern military historians came up with the term "traction trebuchet" to distinguish it from previous torsion machines such as the onager.

The mangonel was called al-manjanīq, arrada, shaytani, or sultani in Arabic. In China, the mangonel was called the pào (砲).

== History ==
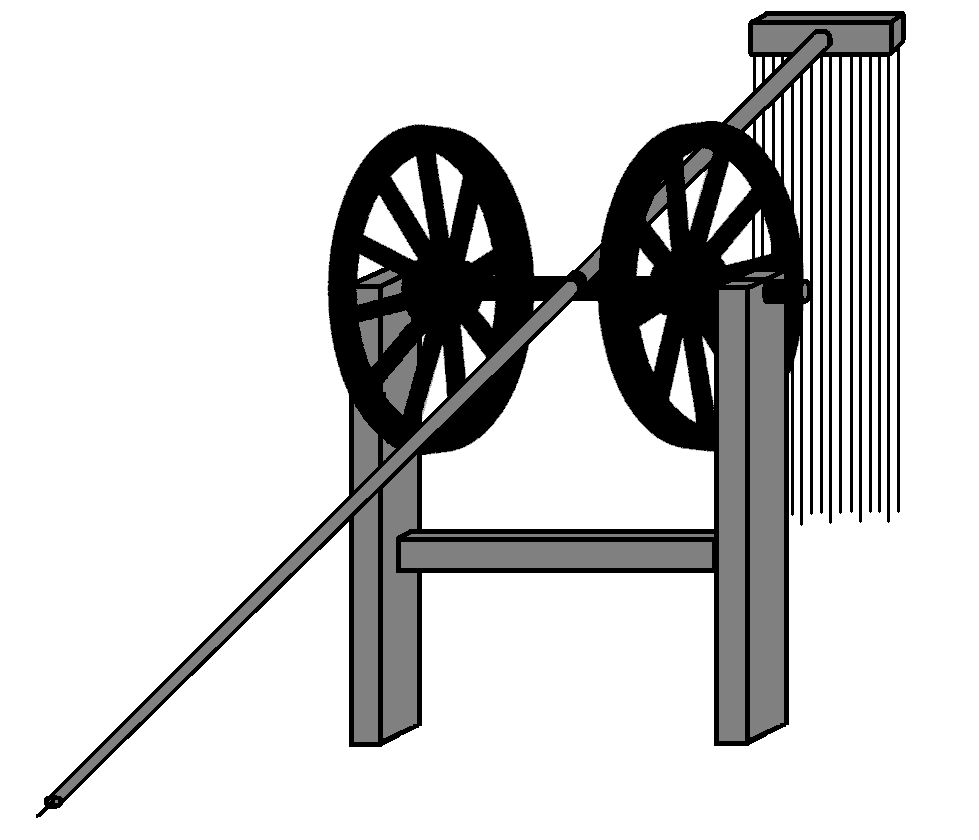
Modern interpretation of the traction trebuchet (mangonel) as described in the Mojing

=== China ===
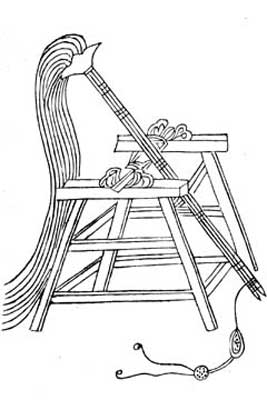
A four-footed mangonel/traction trebuchet from the Wujing Zongyao

The mangonel originated in ancient China. Torsion-based siege weapons such as the ballista and onager are not known to have been used in China.

The first recorded use of mangonels was in ancient China. They were probably used by the Mohists as early as the 4th century BC; descriptions can be found in the Mozi (compiled in the 4th century BC). According to the Mozi, the mangonel was 5 m (17 ft) high with 1 m (4 ft) buried below ground; the attached fulcrum was constructed from the wheels of a cart, the throwing arm was 9–11 m (30–35 ft) long with three quarters above the pivot and a quarter below to which the ropes are attached, and the sling 1 m (2.8 ft) long. The range given for projectiles is 90 m (300 ft), 55 m (180 ft), and 40 m (120 ft). They were used as defensive weapons stationed on walls and sometimes hurled hollowed-out logs filled with burning charcoal to destroy enemy siege works. By the 1st century AD, commentators were interpreting other passages in texts such as the Zuo zhuan and Classic of Poetry as references to the mangonel: "the guai is 'a great arm of wood on which a stone is laid, and this by means of a device [ji] is shot off and so strikes down the enemy.'" The Records of the Grand Historian say that "The flying stones weigh 12 catties and by devices [ji] are shot off 300 paces." Mangonels went into decline during the Han dynasty due to long periods of peace but became a common siege weapon again during the Three Kingdoms period. They were commonly called stone-throwing machines, thunder carriages, and stone carriages in the following centuries. They were used as ship-mounted weapons by the year 573 for attacking enemy fortifications. It seems that during the early 7th century, improvements were made to mangonels, although it is not explicitly stated what. According to a stele in Barkul celebrating Tang Taizong's conquest of what is now Ejin Banner, the engineer Jiang Xingben made great advancements on mangonels that were unknown in ancient times. Jiang Xingben participated in the construction of siege engines for Taizong's campaigns against the Western Regions.

In 617 Li Mi (Sui dynasty) constructed 300 mangonels for his assault on Luoyang; in 621 Li Shimin did the same at Luoyang, and onward into the Song dynasty when in 1161, mangonels operated by Song dynasty soldiers fired bombs of lime and sulphur against the ships of the Jin dynasty navy during the Battle of Caishi. During the Jingde period (1004–1007), many young men rose in office due to their military accomplishments, and one such man, Zhang Cun, was said to have possessed no knowledge except how to operate a Whirlwind mangonel. When the Jurchen Jin dynasty (1115–1234) laid siege to Kaifeng in 1126, they attacked with 5,000 mangonels.

==== Chinese mangonels ====
The Wujing Zongyao lists various types of the mangonel:

- Whirlwind – a swivel mangonel for shooting small missiles that could be turned to face any direction
  - Whirlwind battery – five whirlwind mangonels combined on a single turntable
- Pao che (catapult cart) – a whirlwind mangonel on wheels
- Crouching tiger – medium-sized mangonel considered stronger than the whirlwind type but weaker than the four-footed
- Four-footed – a trestle-frame mangonel for shooting heavier projectiles
  - Two-seven component – different weight classes for the four-footed type indicated by the number of poles bound together to create the swinging arm

Weapon	Crew	Projectile weight: kilograms (pounds)	Range: meters (feet)
Whirlwind	50 (rotating)	1.8 (4.0)	78 (256)
Crouching tiger	70 (rotating)	7.25 (16.0)	78 (256)
Four footed (one arm)	40 (rotating)	1.1 (2.4)	78 (256)
Four footed (two arm)	100 (rotating)	11.3 (25)	120 (390)
Four footed (five arm)	157 (rotating)	44.5 (98)	78 (256)
Four footed (seven arm)	250 (rotating)	56.7 (125)	78 (256)

=== Spread ===
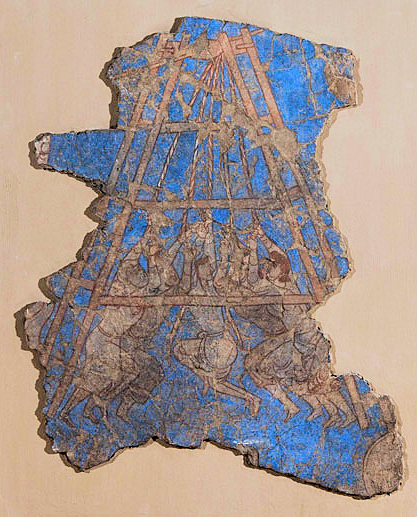
Arabs besieging Samarkand with a traction trebuchet (mangonel), Sogdian mural from Panjakent, 8th c.

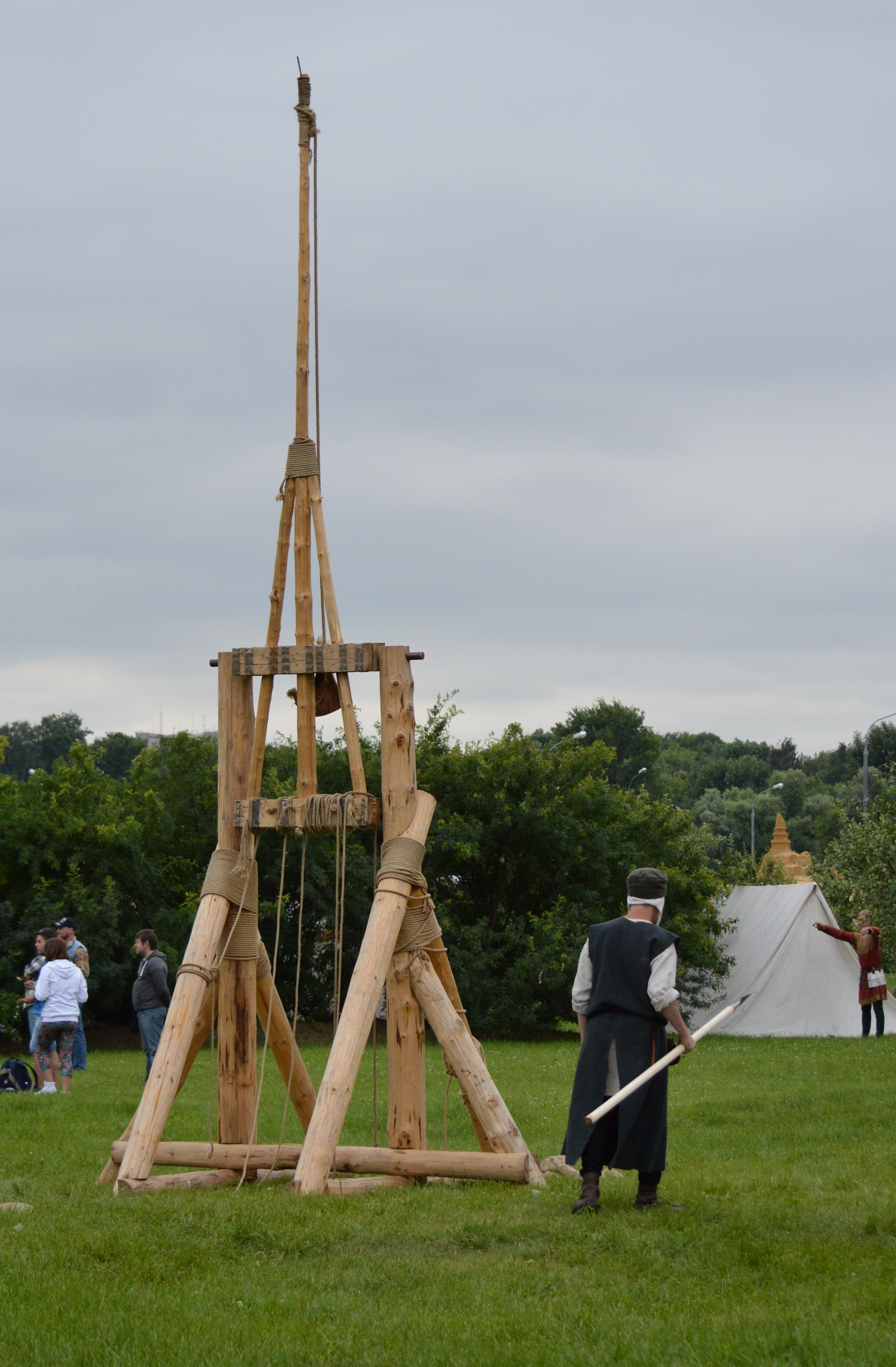
Russian reconstruction of a mangonel (traction trebuchet), 2013

The mangonel was adopted by various peoples west of China such as the Byzantines, Persians, Arabs, and Avars by the sixth to seventh centuries AD. Some scholars suggest that Avars carried the mangonel westward while others claim that the Byzantines already possessed knowledge of the mangonel beforehand. Regardless of the vector of transmission, it appeared in the eastern Mediterranean by the late 6th century AD, where it replaced torsion powered siege engines such as the ballista and onager. The rapid displacement of torsion siege engines was probably due to a combination of reasons. The mangonel is simpler in design, has a faster rate of fire, increased accuracy, and comparable range and power. It was probably also safer than the twisted cords of torsion weapons, "whose bundles of taut sinews stored up huge amounts of energy even in resting state and were prone to catastrophic failure when in use." At the same time, the late Roman Empire seems to have fielded "considerably less artillery than its forebears, organised now in separate units, so the weaponry that came into the hands of successor states might have been limited in quantity." Evidence from Gaul and Germania suggests there was substantial loss of skills and techniques in artillery further west.

According to the Miracles of Saint Demetrius, probably written around 620 by John, Archbishop of Thessaloniki, the Avaro-Slavs attacked Thessaloniki in 586 with more than 50 mangonels. The bombardment lasted for hours, but the operators were inaccurate and most of the shots missed their target. When one stone did reach their target, it "demolished the top of the rampart down to the walkway." The Miracles does not provide a clear date of the siege, which could have been in 586 or 597. An argument has been made that the Byzantines were already acquainted with mangonels prior to this based on the History written by Theophylact Simocatta in the late 620s. The account describes a captured Byzantine soldier named Busas who taught the Avars how to construct a "besieging machine" which led to their conquest of Appiaria in 587. The word used for the machine is helepolis, which does not indicate a specific siege engine. It has been variously interpreted as a battering ram, a stone-throwing trebuchet, and a siege tower. Theophylact's account is vague on descriptions of the device and why it allowed the Avars to take Appiaria after they had already taken many Roman cities beforehand. The Greek term manganikon, from which the Arabic word for trebuchet mandjanik is derived, was also first used to describe Avar machines used against Constantinople in 626. Peter Purton notes that the account by Theophylact is not contemporary and likely written when the mangonel was more common. David Graff and Purton argue that the account by Theophylact has chronological problems and does not explain why the machine used by the Avars in the Miracles was treated as a novelty in either 586 or 597, since the Byzantines would have known about it in both cases. Yet there are no descriptions of the mangonel in the west prior to the encounter with the Avars.

Purton considers it equally likely for the Avars, Byzantines, or Persians to have learned of the mangonel first in the western world. Michael Fulton says it is at least equally likely that the Avars or some other vector transmitted the technology to the Byzantines, but expressed skepticism that the mangonel was complex enough to require explanation by a captured Byzantine soldier. He described Theophylact's account as a "racially motivated explanation of how a supposedly 'barbaric' people were able to replicate and incorporate a piece of 'civilised' technology". Others like Stephen McCotter and John Haldon consider the Avar theory to be the most likely. As McCotter puts it, "there is no good reason to doubt that the Avars may have brought it and the Byzantines copied it." According to Georgios Kardaras, the idea that the Avars directly learned siegecraft from a Byzantine captive is not credible, as they had been perfectly capable of taking walled Byzantine towns beforehand and had been in contact with other tribes who engaged in siege warfare.

The Byzantines may have used the mangonel in 587 against a Persian fort near Akbas, although the operators did not seem to have handled it very effectively, suggesting that it was still a new weapon. The Persians may have used mangonels against Dara in the early 7th century and against Jerusalem in 614. The Arabs had ship mounted mangonel by 653 and used them at Mecca in 683. The Franks and Saxons adopted the weapon in the 8th century. The Life of Louis the Pious contains the earliest western European reference to mangonels in its account of the siege of Tortosa (808–809). In the 890s, Abbo Cernuus described mango or manganaa used at the Siege of Paris (885–886) which had high posts, presumably meaning they used trebuchet-type throwing arms. In 1173, the Republic of Pisa tried to capture an island castle with mangonels on galleys. Mangonels were also used in India.

The catapult, the account of which has been translated from the Greek several times, was quadrangular, with a wide base but narrowing towards the top, using large iron rollers to which were fixed timber beams "similar to the beams of big houses", having at the back a sling, and at the front thick cables, enabling the arm to be raised and lowered, and which threw "enormous blocks into the air with a terrifying noise".

— Peter Purton

=== Independent invention ===
According to Leife Inge Ree Peterson, a mangonel could have been used at Theodosiopolis in 421 but was "likely an onager". Peterson says that mangonels may have been independently invented or at least known in the Eastern Mediterranean by 500 AD based on records of different and better artillery weapons, however there is no explicit description of a mangonel. According to Peterson's timeline and presumption that the mangonel became widespread throughout the Roman Empire by the mid-6th century, mangonels would also have been used in Spain and Italy by the mid 6th century, in Africa by the 7th century, and by the Franks in the 8th century. Tracy Rihll suggests that the mangonel was independently invented through an evolution of the Byzantine staff-sling, although this has received little support. There are no sources indicating whether Byzantium received the mangonel from East Asia or if it was independently invented.

Thus, on the basis of fairly hard evidence of unknown machinery in Joshua the Stylite and Agathias, as well as good indications of its construction in Procopius (especially when read against Strategikon), it is likely that the traction trebuchet had become known in the eastern Mediterranean area at the latest by around 500. The philological and (admittedly circumstantial) historical evidence may even support a date around 400.

— Inge Ree Peterson

=== Notable uses in history ===
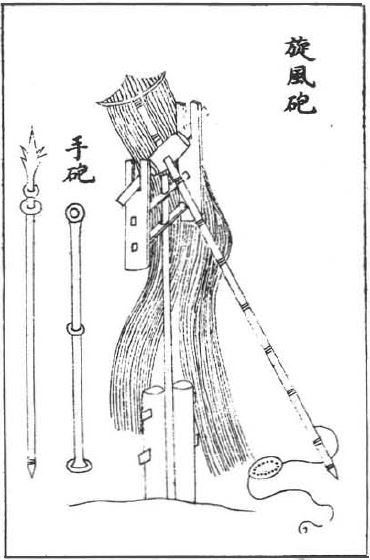
A "whirlwind" trebuchet from the Wujing Zongyao

The mangonel was most efficient as an anti-personnel weapon, used in a supportive position alongside archers and slingers. Most accounts of mangonels describe them as light artillery weapons while actual penetration of defenses was the result of mining or siege towers. At the Siege of Kamacha in 766, Byzantine defenders used wooden cover to protect themselves from the enemy artillery while inflicting casualties with their stone throwers. Michael the Syrian noted that at the siege of Balis in 823 it was the defenders that suffered from bombardment rather than the fortifications. At the siege of Kaysum, Abdallah ibn Tahir al-Khurasani used artillery to damage houses in the town. The Sack of Amorium in 838 saw the use of mangonels to drive away defenders and destroy wooden defenses. At the siege of Marand in 848, mangonels were used, "reportedly killing 100 and wounding 400 on each side during the eight-month siege." During the siege of Baghdad in 865, defensive artillery was responsible for repelling an attack on the city gate while mangonels on boats claimed a hundred of the defenders' lives.

Some exceptionally large and powerful mangonels have been described during the 11th century or later. At the Siege of Manzikert (1054), the Seljuks' initial siege artillery was countered by the defenders' own, which shot stones at the besieging machine. In response, the Seljuks constructed another one requiring 400 men to pull and throw stones weighing 20 kilograms (44 lb). A breach was created on the first shot but the machine was burnt down by the defenders. According to Matthew of Edessa, this machine weighed 3,400 kilograms (7,500 lb) and caused several casualties to the city's defenders. Ibn al-Adim describes a mangonel capable of throwing a man in 1089. At the siege of Haizhou in 1161, a mangonel was reported to have had a range of 200 paces (over 400 m (1,300 ft)).

=== Decline ===
West of China, the mangonel remained the primary siege engine until the late 12th century when it was replaced by the counterweight trebuchet. In China the mangonel was the primary siege engine until the counterweight trebuchet was introduced during the Mongol conquest of the Song dynasty in the 13th century. The counterweight trebuchet did not completely replace the mangonel. Despite its greater range, counterweight trebuchets had to be constructed close to the site of the siege unlike mangonels, which were smaller, lighter, cheaper, and easier to take apart and put back together again where necessary. The superiority of the counterweight trebuchet was not clear cut. Of this, the Hongwu Emperor stated in 1388: "The old type of trebuchet was really more convenient. If you have a hundred of those machines, then when you are ready to march, each wooden pole can be carried by only four men. Then when you reach your destination, you encircle the city, set them up, and start shooting!" The mangonel continued to serve as an anti-personnel weapon. The Norwegian text of 1240, Speculum regale, explicitly states this division of functions. Mangonels were to be used for hitting people in undefended areas. As late as the Siege of Acre (1291), where the Mamluk Sultanate fielded 72 or 92 trebuchets, the majority were still mangonels while 14 or 15 were counterweight trebuchets. The counterweight trebuchets were unable to create a breach in Acre's walls and the Mamluks entered the city by sapping the northeast corner of the outer wall. The Templar of Tyre described the faster firing mangonels as more dangerous to the defenders than the counterweight trebuchets.

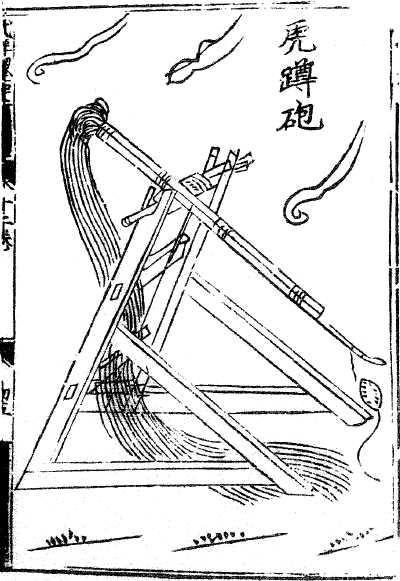
Crouching tiger trebuchet (stationary mangonel) from the Wujing Zongyao

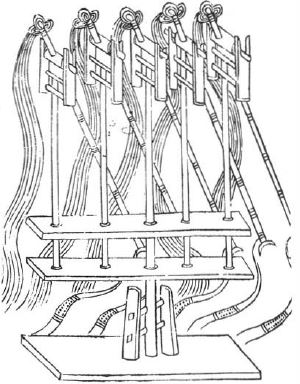
Five whirlwind trebuchets (swivel mangonels) from the Wujing Zongyao

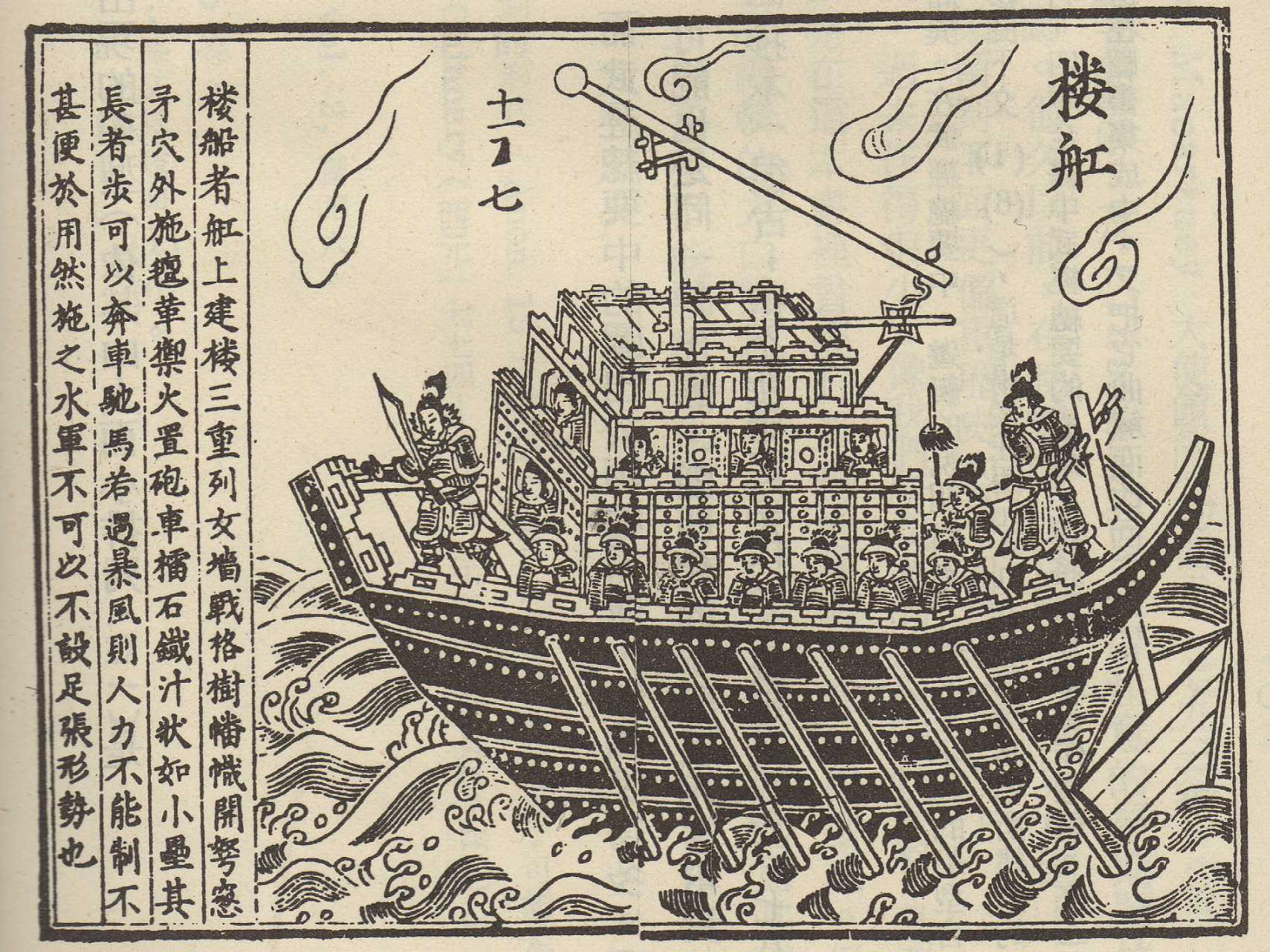
Mangonel on a Song Dynasty warship from the Wujing Zongyao

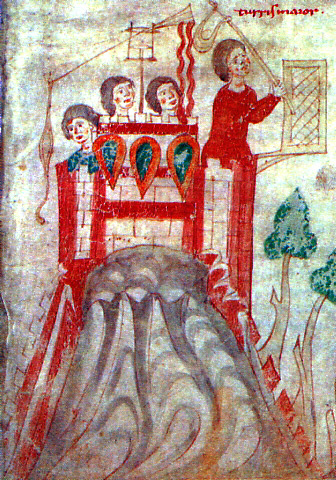
12th century depiction of a mangonel (also called a perrier) next to a staff slinger

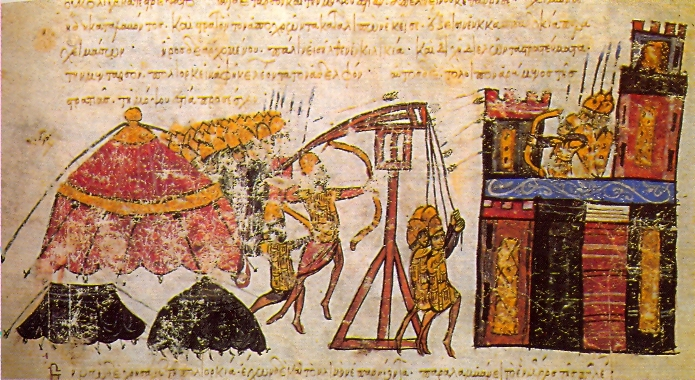
Sicilian-Byzantine depiction of a mangonel, 12th–13th century

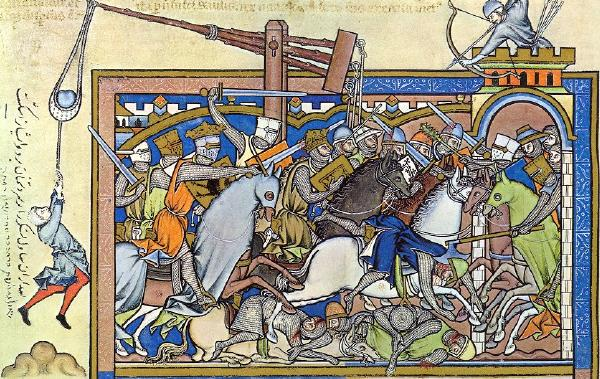
13th century depiction of a mangonel

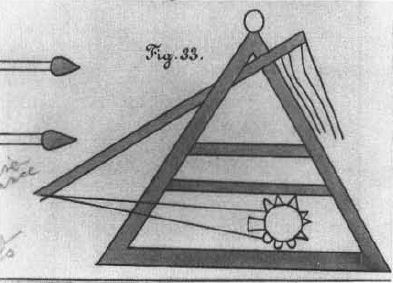
Muslim mangonel, 1285

== See also ==
- Catapult
- Couillard
- Springald
- List of siege engines

== Bibliography ==
- Bradbury, Jim (1992), The Medieval Siege, The Boydell Press
- Chevedden, Paul E.; et al. (July 1995). "The Trebuchet" (PDF). Scientific American. 273 (1): 66–71. Bibcode:1995SciAm.273a..66C. doi:10.1038/scientificamerican0795-66. Archived from the original (PDF) on 2012-01-11.. Original version.
- Chevedden, Paul E. (2000). "The Invention of the Counterweight Trebuchet: A Study in Cultural Diffusion". Dumbarton Oaks Papers. 54: 71–116. doi:10.2307/1291833. JSTOR 1291833.
- Dennis, George (1998). "Byzantine Heavy Artillery: The Helepolis". Greek, Roman, and Byzantine Studies (39).
- Fulton, Michael S. (2016), Artillery in and around the Latin East
- Fulton, Michael S. (2018), Artillery in the Era of the Crusades
- Graff, David A. (2016), The Eurasian Way of War Military Practice in Seventh-Century China and Byzantium, Routledge
- Gravett, Christopher (1990). Medieval Siege Warfare. Osprey Publishing.
- Hansen, Peter Vemming (April 1992). "Medieval Siege Engines Reconstructed: The Witch with Ropes for Hair". Military Illustrated (47): 15–20.
- Hansen, Peter Vemming (1992). "Experimental Reconstruction of the Medieval Trebuchet". Acta Archaeologica (63): 189–208. Archived from the original on 2007-04-03.
- Huuri, Kalervo (1941). "Zur Geschicte de mitterlalterlichen Geschützwesens aus orientalischen Quellen". Societas Orientalia Fennica, Studia Orientalia. 9 (3): 50–220.
- Jahsman, William E.; MTA Associates (2000). The Counterweighted Trebuchet – an Excellent Example of Applied Retromechanics.
- Jahsman, William E.; MTA Associates (2001). FATAnalysis (PDF).
- Kardaras, Georgios (2019), Byzantium and the Avars, 6th–9th Century AD: Political, Diplomatic and Cultural Relations, Brill
- Archbishop of Thessalonike, John I (1979). Miracula S. Demetrii, ed. P. Lemerle, Les plus anciens recueils des miracles de saint Demitrius et la penetration des slaves dans les Balkans. Centre National de la Recherche Scientifique.
- Liang, Jieming (2006). Chinese Siege Warfare: Mechanical Artillery & Siege Weapons of Antiquity – An Illustrated History.
- Needham, Joseph (2004). Science and Civilization in China. Cambridge University Press. p. 218.
- Needham, Joseph (1986). Science and Civilization in China: Volume 4, Part 2. Taipei: Caves Books, Ltd.
- Needham, Joseph (1994), Science and Civilization in China 5–6
- Nicolle, David (2002), Medieval Siege Weapons 1, Osprey Publishing
- Noble, T. F. X., ed. (2009), Charlemagne and Louis the Pious: The Lives by Einhard, Notker, Ermoldus, Thegan and the Astronomer, Pennsylvania State University Press
- Payne-Gallwey, Sir Ralph (1903). "LVIII The Trebuchet". The Crossbow With a Treatise on the Balista and Catapult of the Ancients and an Appendix on the Catapult, Balista and Turkish Bow (Reprint ed.). pp. 308–315.
- Peterson, Leif Inge Ree (2013), Siege Warfare and Military Organization in the Successor States, Brill
- Purton, Peter (2006), The myth of the mangonel: torsion artillery in the Middle Ages
- Purton, Peter (2009), A History of the Early Medieval Siege c.450–1200, The Boydell Press
- Purton, Peter (2018), The Medieval Military Engineer: From the Roman Empire to the Sixteenth Century
- Saimre, Tanel (2007), Trebuchet – a gravity operated siege engine. A Study in Experimental Archaeology (PDF)
- Schneider, Rudolf (1910). Die Artillerie des Mittelalters. Berlin: Weidmannsche Buchhandlung.
- Siano, Donald B. (November 16, 2013). Trebuchet Mechanics (PDF). Archived from the original on March 3, 2014.
- Al-Tarsusi (1947). Instruction of the masters on the means of deliverance from disasters in wars. Bodleian MS Hunt. 264. ed. Cahen, Claude, "Un traite d'armurerie compose pour Saladin". Bulletin d'etudes orientales 12 [1947–1948]:103–163.
- Tarver, W.T.S. (1995), The Traction Trebuchet: A Reconstruction of an Early Medieval Siege Engine
- Turnbull, Stephen (2001), Siege Weapons of the Far East (1) AD 612–1300, Osprey Publishing
