= Onager (weapon) =

Roman catapult-style torsion siege engine

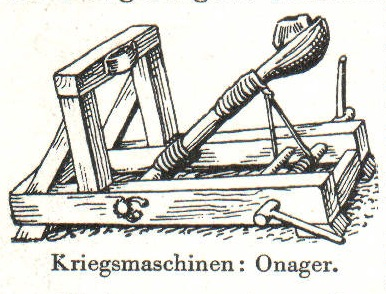
Onager with a bowl bucket

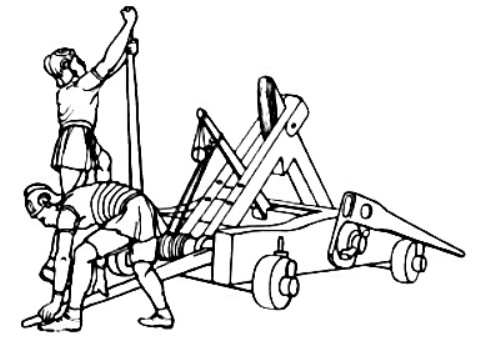
Sketch of an onager with a sling, a later improvement that increased the length of the throwing arm, from Antique technology by Diels.

The onager (UK: /ˈɒnədʒə/, /ˈɒnəɡə/; US: /ˈɑːnədʒər/) was a Roman torsion-powered siege engine. It is a type of catapult commonly depicted with a bowl, bucket, or sling at the end of its throwing arm. The onager was first mentioned in 353 AD by Ammianus Marcellinus, who described onagers as the same as a scorpion. The onager is often confused with the later mangonel, a "traction trebuchet" that replaced torsion powered siege engines in the 6th century AD.

== Etymology ==
According to two authors of the later Roman Empire who wrote on military affairs, the onager's name, meaning wild ass, derived from the kicking action of the machine that threw stones into the air. This action resembled the kicking action of the hooves of the Syrian wild ass, a subspecies of onager, which was native to the eastern part of the empire. In Latin this species was known as onagrum.

== Design ==
The onager consisted of a large frame placed horizontally on the ground with a vertical frame of solid timber rigidly fixed to its front end. A vertical spoke that passed through a rope bundle fastened to the frame had a cup, bucket, or sling attached which contained a projectile. To fire it, the spoke or arm was forced down, against the tension of twisted ropes or other springs, by a windlass, and then suddenly released. As the sling swung outwards, one end would release, as with a staff-sling, and the projectile would be hurled forward. The arm would then be caught by a padded beam or bed when it could be winched back again. It weighed around two to six tons. Flavius Josephus described an instance where an onager shot a 100 lb (45 kg) rock over a 400 yd (370 m) distance. According to Ammianus Marcellinus, a single-armed onager required eight men to wind down the arm. When it fired, the recoil was so great that it made the onager impossible to place on stone walls because the stones would be dislodged. This was confirmed by a reconstructed onager, considerably smaller than the ones described in the sources, that still caused substantial recoil. Its shot weighed 3–4 kg (6.6–8.8 lb).

According to the historian Peter Purton:

By the 4th century, its place as a torsion-powered stone-thrower had been taken by the onager, a rather simpler version operating on the same principle. This time, inside a wooden frame that had to be of massive proportions, a single arm was held in a twisted skein of sinew or horsehair. It was loaded by pulling down the arm and placing the missile in the cup at the end, and, on release, the arm flew up to send the missile on its way. The arm was stopped when it hit the necessarily strong crossbeam. Its optimum range was estimated at about 130 m (430 ft). Although it might reach much further, by then the force of the impact would have been much reduced. The 2002 reconstruction managed to throw a 26 kg (57 lb) limestone ball 90 yd (82 m) before the timber of the weapon disintegrated after its second shot.

— Peter Purton

== History ==
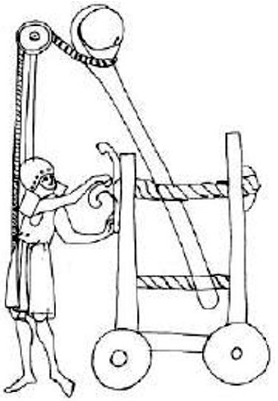
The earliest known medieval illustration of a torsion engine (onager), from Walter de Milemete's De nobilitatibus, sapientiis, et prudentiis regum, 1326

The onager was used from the 4th century until the 6th century. It may have originated in the third century BC. It was initially developed for the purpose of disrupting enemy lines and destroying walls. The late-fourth century author Ammianus Marcellinus describes 'onager' as a neologism for scorpions and relates various incidents in which the engines fire both rocks and arrow-shaped missiles. According to Ammianus, the onager was a single-armed torsion engine unlike the twin-armed ballista before it. It needed eight men just to wind down the arm and could not be placed on fortifications because of its great recoil. It had very low mobility and was difficult to aim. Originally it used a bucket or cup to hold the projectile but at some point it was replaced with a sling, which elongated the throwing arm without burdening it and allowed for a greater range of shot.

In 378, the onager was used against the Goths at Adrianople and although it did not cause any casualties, its large stone projectile was incredibly frightening to the Goths. The late-fourth or early-fifth century military writer Vegetius stipulates that a legion ought to field ten onagers, one for each cohort. These he says should be transported fully assembled on ox carts to ensure readiness in case of sudden attack, in which case the onagers could be used for defense immediately. For Vegetius, the onagers were stone throwing machines.

The range of the onager was increased at some point during the Roman imperial period when a sling replaced the cup at the end of the arm. The sling effectively elongated the throwing arm, without adding any notable mass. This allowed the projectile to travel farther in the same amount of time before release, increasing acceleration and release velocity without retarding the angular velocity of the throwing arm or increasing the potential energy in the coil, which would have required the whole structure of the engine to be strengthened.

— Michael S. Fulton

In the late 6th century the Pannonian Avars brought the Chinese traction trebuchet, otherwise known as the mangonel, to the Mediterranean, where it soon replaced the slower and more complex torsion powered engines. The onager may have continued to be used by the Byzantines and Arabs during the Middle Ages. In modern history, the mangonel is often misrepresented as an onager although there is no evidence of its usage beyond the 6th century AD.

Chevalier de Folard and Robert Melvill made the first attempts to reconstruct the onager in the 18th century. Swiss general Guillaume Henri Dufour made another attempt to reconstruct the onager based on the work of de Folard in 1840. Napoleon III had his general Verchère de Reffye create a reconstruction of the onager. By the end of the nineteenth century Sir Ralph Payne-Gallwey made another attempt at reconstructing the onager. Later, the German major-general Erwin Schramm and the British scholar Eric Marsden made a reconstruction of the onager which became the basis of the modern understanding of the weapon.

== Effectiveness ==
The onager was considered to be less accurate and cruder than the ballista. One reason the onager may have become the Roman military's primary type of torsion catapult was because it was easier to produce and required less technical knowledge to operate. The onager was used to destroy walls and create confusion amongst the enemy lines. Ammianus Marcellinus described an instance during an Alemanni incursion in Gaul where although the onager fired a rock that did not kill anyone, it created mass confusion amongst the enemy and routed them.

== See also ==
- Roman siege engines
- Springald
- Torsion siege engine

== Bibliography ==
- Fulton, Michael S. (2016), Artillery in and around the Latin East
- Fulton, Michael S. (2018), Artillery in the Era of the Crusades, Brill
- Purton, Peter (2006), The myth of the mangonel torsion artillery in the Middle Ages
