= Petrary =

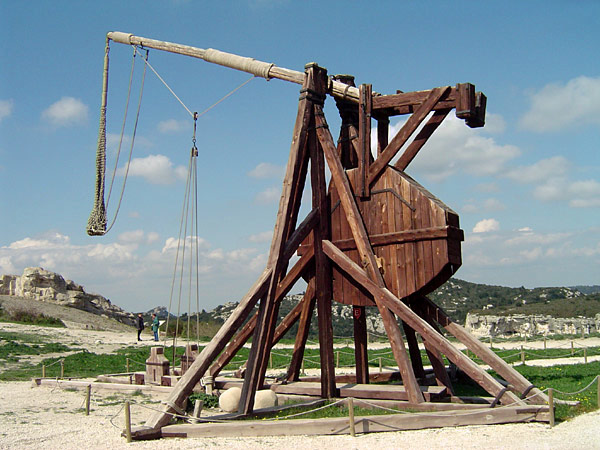
Trebuchet at Château des Baux, France

Petrary (from Greek petra "stone") is a generic term for medieval stone-throwing siege engines such as mangonels and trebuchets, used to hurl large rocks against the walls of the besieged city, in an attempt to break down the wall and create an entry point. Catapult, trebuchet, and mangonel are all types of petrary, but ballista-style armaments, which shoot bolts or arrows, would not fit into this category.

Petraries are sometimes considered smaller versions of mangonels. In 1159, Frederick Barbarossa, the Holy Roman Emperor, distinguished between petraries, which were small artillery, and mangonels, which were large artillery. The opposite is also true and sometimes the petrary is considered the more powerful weapon, whereas mangonels were the smaller artillery, as was the case in 1185 when the French set up light "Turkish mangonels" and heavy petraries and 1195 when Baldwin V, Count of Hainaut laid siege to Huy.

== Bibliography ==
- Purton, Peter (2009), A History of the Early Medieval Siege c.450-1200, The Boydell Press, ISBN 978-1-84615-803-2, OCLC 738476072
