= Roberto Valturio =

Italian engineer and writer

- Born: 1413; Rimini
- Died: 1483 (aged 69–70)
- Engineering career
- Projects: De Re militari

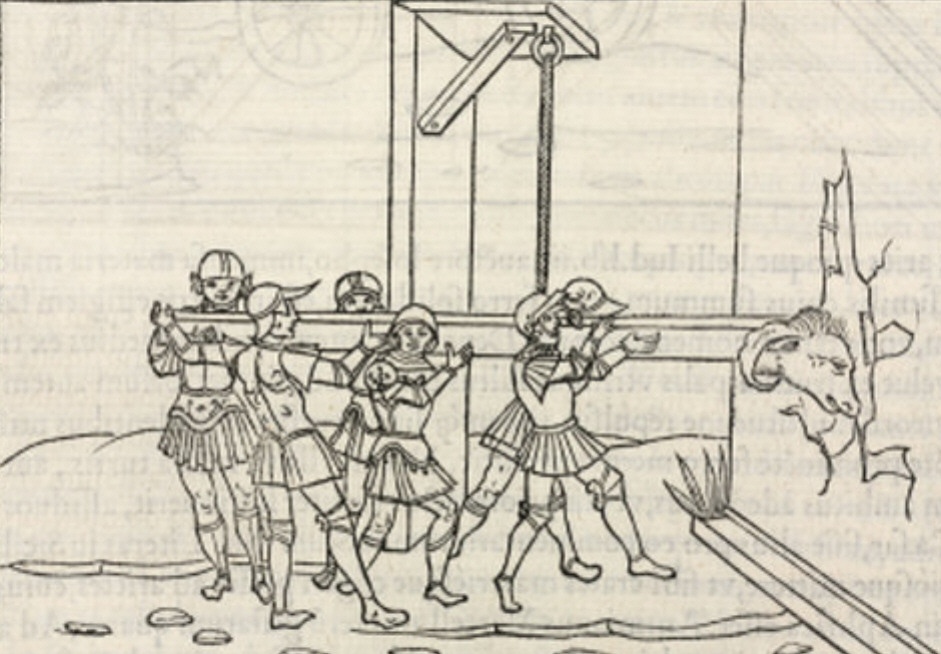
Extract of De Re Militari, printed in 1534 in Paris.

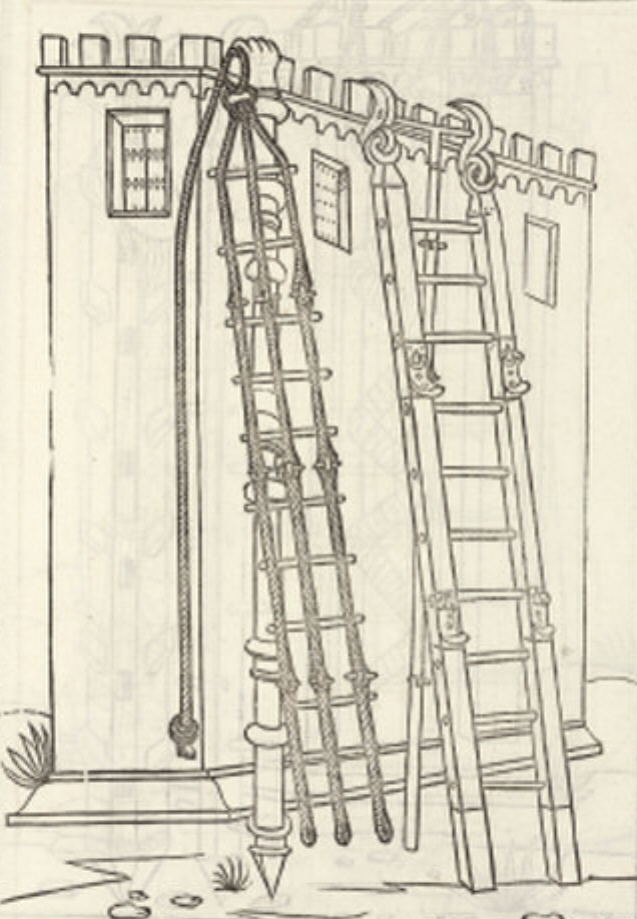
Extract of De Re Militari

Roberto Valturio (1413–1483) was an Italian engineer and writer born in Rimini. He was the author of the military treatise De Re militari (before 1463). The work consists of a preface, with a dedication to Sigismondo Pandolfo Malatesta; a list of the classical works mentioned and an introduction on the history of warfare. The work was widely known: King Louis XI of France, King Matthias Corvinus of Hungary, Duke of Urbino Federico da Montefeltro and the ruler of Florence Lorenzo de' Medici had a copy of the printed book. In Leonardo da Vinci's list of books Roberto Valturio has been mentioned. This indicates that Leonardo had been in the possession of Roberto's work.
