= Grui (disambiguation) =

Grui is a suborder of crane-like birds.

Grui may also refer to:

- Mușetești, a village in Romania
- Grui, a tributary of the river Amaradia in Gorj County, Romania
- Grui, a tributary of the river Dâmbovița in Călărași County, Romania

== See also ==
- Gruiu (disambiguation)
