= Amaradia (Gorj) =

Amaradia Amaradia Pietroasă
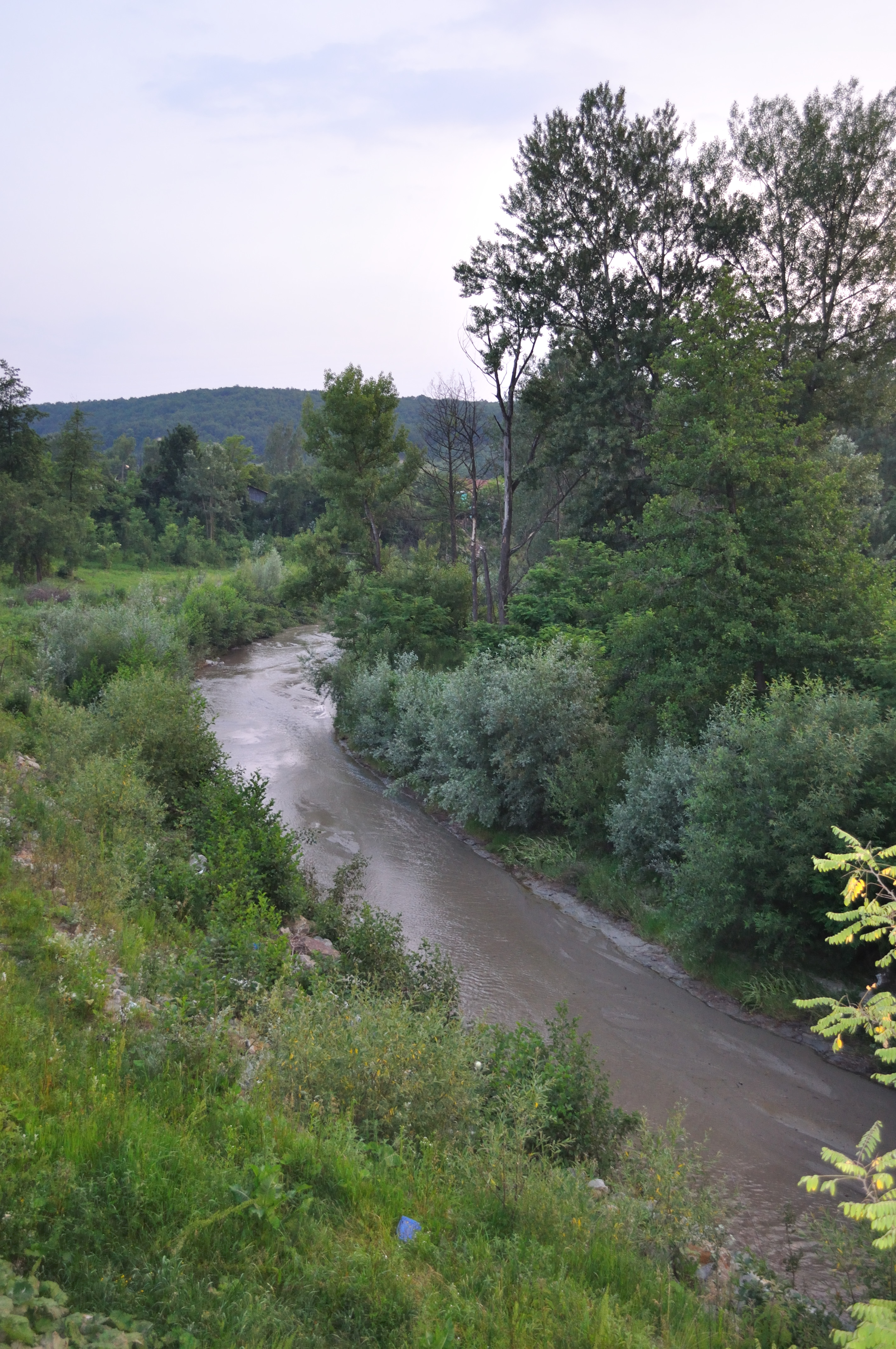

- Location within Romania

Location
- Country: Romania
- Counties: Gorj County
- Villages: Mușetești, Bălăneşti, Iași-Gorj

Physical characteristics
- Mouth: Jiu
  - location: Târgu Jiu
  - coordinates: 44.9824°N 23.2298°E
- Length: 41 km (25 mi)
- Basin size: 247 km^{2} (95 sq mi)

Basin features
- Progression: Jiu→ Danube→ Black Sea
- Tributaries
  - left: Zlast

The Amaradia (also: Amaradia Pietroasă) is a left tributary of the river Jiu in Romania. It discharges into the Jiu in Drăguțești, south of the city Târgu Jiu. Its length is 41 km (25 mi) and its basin size is 247 km^{2} (95 sq mi).

== Tributaries ==
The following rivers are tributaries to the river Amaradia (from source to mouth):

- Left: Gornac, Zlast
- Right: Grui, Inoasa, Holdun
