= Iași-Gorj oil field =

Oil field in Gorj County, Romania

Iași-Gorj
- Country: Romania
- Region: Gorj County
- Offshore/onshore: onshore
- Operator: Petrom

Field history
- Discovery: 1964
- Start of development: 1964
- Start of production: 1965

Production
- Current production of oil: 3,000 barrels per day (~1.5×10^{5} t/a)
- Estimated oil in place: 20.8 million tonnes (~ 24.6×10^{6} m^{3} or 155 million bbl)

The Iaşi-Gorj oil field is an oil field located in Drăguțești, Gorj County. It was discovered in 1964 and developed by Petrom. It began production in 1965 and produces oil. The total proven reserves of the Iași-Gorj oil field are around 155 million barrels (20.8 million tonnes), and production is centered on 3,000 barrels per day (480 m^{3}/d).
