= Siege warfare in ancient Rome =

Sieges in Roman History

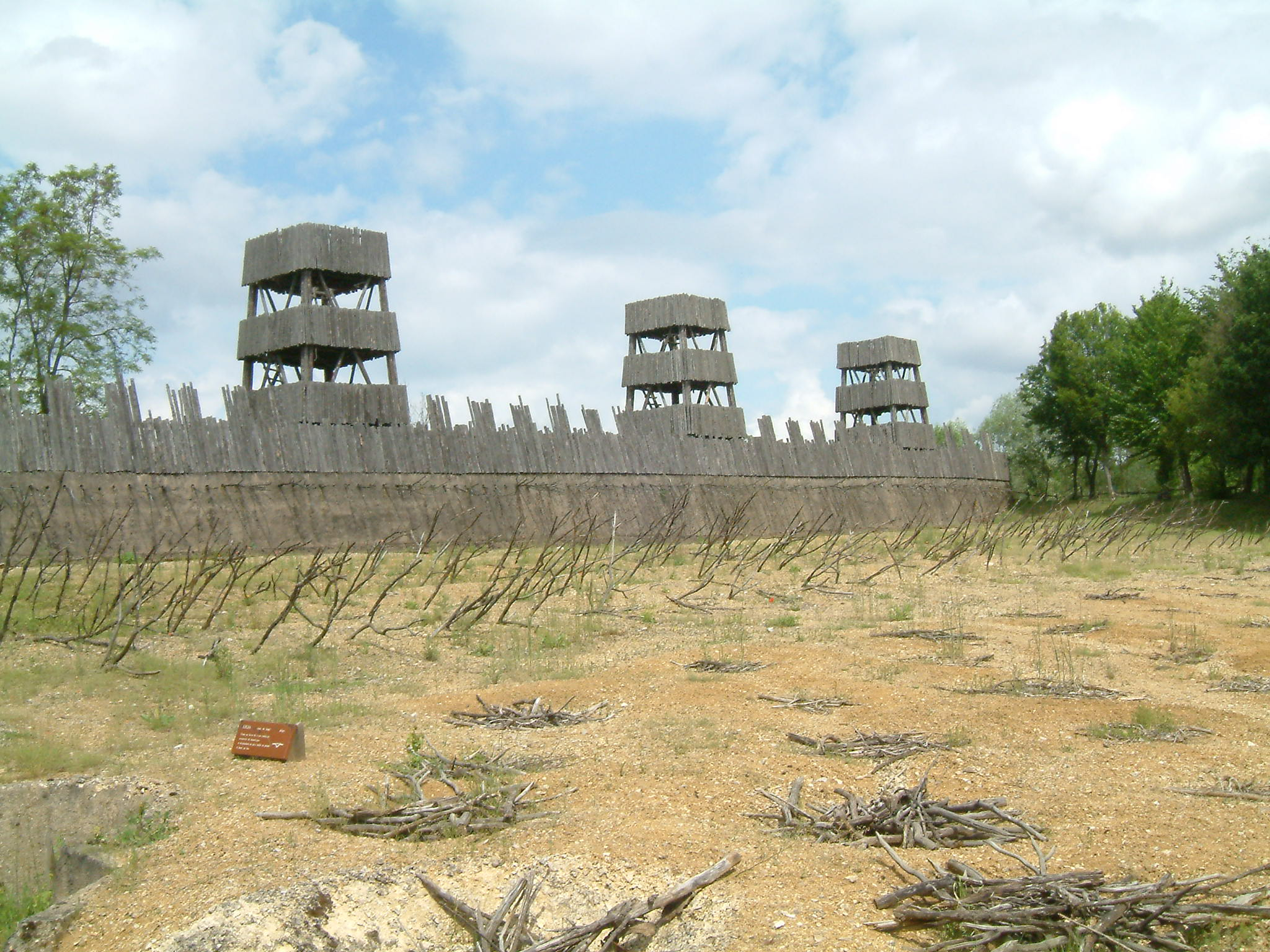
Reconstruction of the fortifications of Caesar's army at Alesia

Siege in ancient Rome was one of the techniques used by the Roman army to achieve ultimate victory, although pitched battles were considered the only true form of warfare. Nevertheless, the importance that siege action could have in the warfare framework of that era cannot be underestimated. Hannibal was unable to defeat the might of Rome because, although he had defeated the Roman armies in the open field, he had proved unable to assault the city of Rome. As time went on, the armies of the late Roman and Imperial Republics also became particularly adept at siege warfare: Gaius Julius Caesar's conquest of Gaul was the combination of a whole series of pitched battles and long sieges, culminating in that of Alesia in 52 BCE. To seize the main center of an enemy people seemed to be the best way to bring a conflict to an end, as also happened in the time of Trajan, during the conquest of Dacia, when the enemy capital, Sarmizegetusa Regia, was besieged and occupied. For this purpose, numerous works (an agger surmounted by a palisade, with ditches around it, as well as ramps and pitfalls of various kinds) and siege machines were, therefore, required for variety and functionality, engaging soldiers in the execution of important military engineering works.

Gnaeus Domitius Corbulo used to say that the enemy was won with the hoe, that is, with construction works.

— Frontinus, Stratagemata, IV, 7, 2.

== Siege techniques ==
The Romans used three main siege techniques to seize enemy cities:

1. by starvation (it took more time, but less loss of life on the part of the attackers), by creating all around the besieged city a series of fortifications (an inner and sometimes an outer contravallation, as in the case of Alesia) that would prevent the enemy from obtaining supplies (of food and even water, by diverting the courses of the rivers) or worse, from escaping, evading the siege, in the hope of leading the besieged to surrender. The attacked site was then surrounded by numerous emplacements, where the main one housed the headquarters, as well as a series of other linked forts.
2. with a massive frontal attack, employing a large amount of armor, artillery, ramparts, and siege towers. The final outcome was normally faster but with a high price in loss of armor by the Roman assailant. In this case a preparatory action to the assault, by artillery, was carried out to cause damage to the walls, produce casualties among the besieged and weaken the morale of the survivors. Immediately afterwards, legionaries would approach the city walls in tortoise formation, while archers and slingers would launch a "shower" of darts (including flaming ones) at the besieged, to "cover" the Roman infantrymen. Ladders, mobile towers and rams also approached, until legions and auxilia, having reached the top of the walls, engaged in a series of "hand-to-hand" duels. This was followed by the sacking of the city, now at the mercy of the Roman armies.
3. with a sudden and unexpected attack that gave the besieged enemy no time to reason.

== History of the most significant Roman sieges ==
Over time, the various siege techniques were perfected in ancient Rome, due in part to the input of Hellenic culture from the cities of Magna Graecia, the Etruscans, and the confrontation with the Carthaginian enemy during the three Punic Wars.

=== Republican era: first period (509–201 BC) ===
==== 508/504 BC? ====
Rome, after the ouster of the last king in 509 BC, was besieged by the Etruscan lucumo, Porsena, who had been called by Tarquinius Superbus to his aid after the Romans established the Republic. Legend has it that Porsena, full of admiration for the acts of valor of Horatius Cocles, Mucius Scaevola and Cloelia, gave up the conquest and returned to Chiusi.

==== 502 BC ====
The first use of war machines by the Romans would date back to this year according to Livy, on the occasion of the siege of Suessa Pometia, conducted with vineae and other undefined structures. From this it can be deduced that there were already military technicians for the construction of the first instruments of poliorcetica on that occasion.

==== 436 BC ====
The city of Fidene was conquered by the Romans with a new technique: while the Etruscans barricaded themselves inside the city, the Romans with false attacks from four different directions at four different times, covered the noise of the excavations and reached the fortress through a long tunnel that passed under the enemy walls.

==== 396 BC ====
The city of Veii also fell a few years later using the same technique of the tunnel dug under the walls. The fall of the Etruscan city took place, according to legend, after ten long years of siege (similarly to what had happened with the city of Troy).

==== 390 or 386 BC ====
Rome itself was besieged and sacked by an army of Senones Gauls led by Brennus. It represents one of the most traumatic episodes in Rome's history, so much so that it is recorded in the annals as Clades Gallica, or Gallic defeat. Polybius, Livy, Diodorus Siculus, and Plutarch bear witness to it.

==== 250 BC ====
In the siege of Lilybaeum they expertly employed all the siege techniques they had learned during the Pyrrhic Wars of 280-275 B.C., including siege towers, battering rams, and vinea. It should be added that an early use of throwing machines by the Roman army seems to have been introduced by the First Punic War, where it was necessary to face the Carthaginians in long sieges of their powerful cities, defended by imposing walls and equipped with sophisticated artillery.

Archimedes may have used his mirrors collectively to reflect sunlight to burn the ships of the Roman fleet during the siege of Syracuse.

==== 214–212 BC ====
During the long siege of Syracuse operated by Consul Marcus Claudius Marcellus, the Romans had sufficient experience in both sea and land sieges, although they struggled with the innovative defensive techniques adopted by Archimedes. In fact, it is said that when:

the Syracusans, when they saw the Romans invade the city from the two fronts, land and sea, were stunned and dumb with fear. They thought that nothing could counter the momentum of an attack in force of such proportions.

— Plutarch, Life of Marcellus, 14.

However, Archimedes prepared the defense of the city, along the 27 km of defensive walls, with new means of artillery. These were ballistae, catapults and scorpions, as well as other means such as manus ferrea and burning mirrors, with which he put Roman attacks by sea and land in serious difficulty. The Romans, for their part, continued their assaults from the sea with quinqueremes and by land by attacking with every means at their disposal (from siege towers, battering rams, vinae, and sambucae).

The Romans, having set up these means, thought of assaulting the towers, but Archimedes, having prepared machines for launching darts at all distances, aiming at the assailants with ballistae and catapults that struck farther and safer, wounded many soldiers and spread serious havoc and disorder throughout the army; when the machines then launched too far, they resorted to less powerful ones that struck at the required distance. [...] When the Romans were within the range of the darts, Archimedes contrived another machine against the soldiers embarked on the ships: from the inner side of the wall he had frequent loopholes open that were the height of a man and about a palm wide from the outer side: near these he had archers and scorpionettes arranged, and striking them through the loopholes put the embarked soldiers out of action. [...] When they attempted to lift the sambucas, he resorted to machines which he had made ready along the wall and which, usually invisible, at the moment of need tied menacingly above the wall and protruded for a great distance with their horns out of the battlements: these could lift stones weighing ten talents and even blocks of lead. When the sambuca approached, they would spin the end of the machine with a rope in the required direction and by means of a spring hurl a stone: it ensued that not only the sambuca was shattered but also the ship carrying it and the sailors were in extreme danger.

— Polybius, The Histories, VIII, 5.

Marcellus then decided to maintain the siege, trying to crush the city by starvation. The siege went on for a full 18 months, a length of time so long that considerable disagreements erupted in Syracuse among the people to the point that the pro-Roman side engineered treachery, allowing the Romans to break in in the middle of the night, when the gates of the northern part of the city were opened. Syracuse fell and was sacked, but not the nearby island of Ortygia, which was well protected by other walls and resisted for a short time. The great Syracusan scientist Archimedes, who was killed by mistake by a soldier, also died on that occasion.

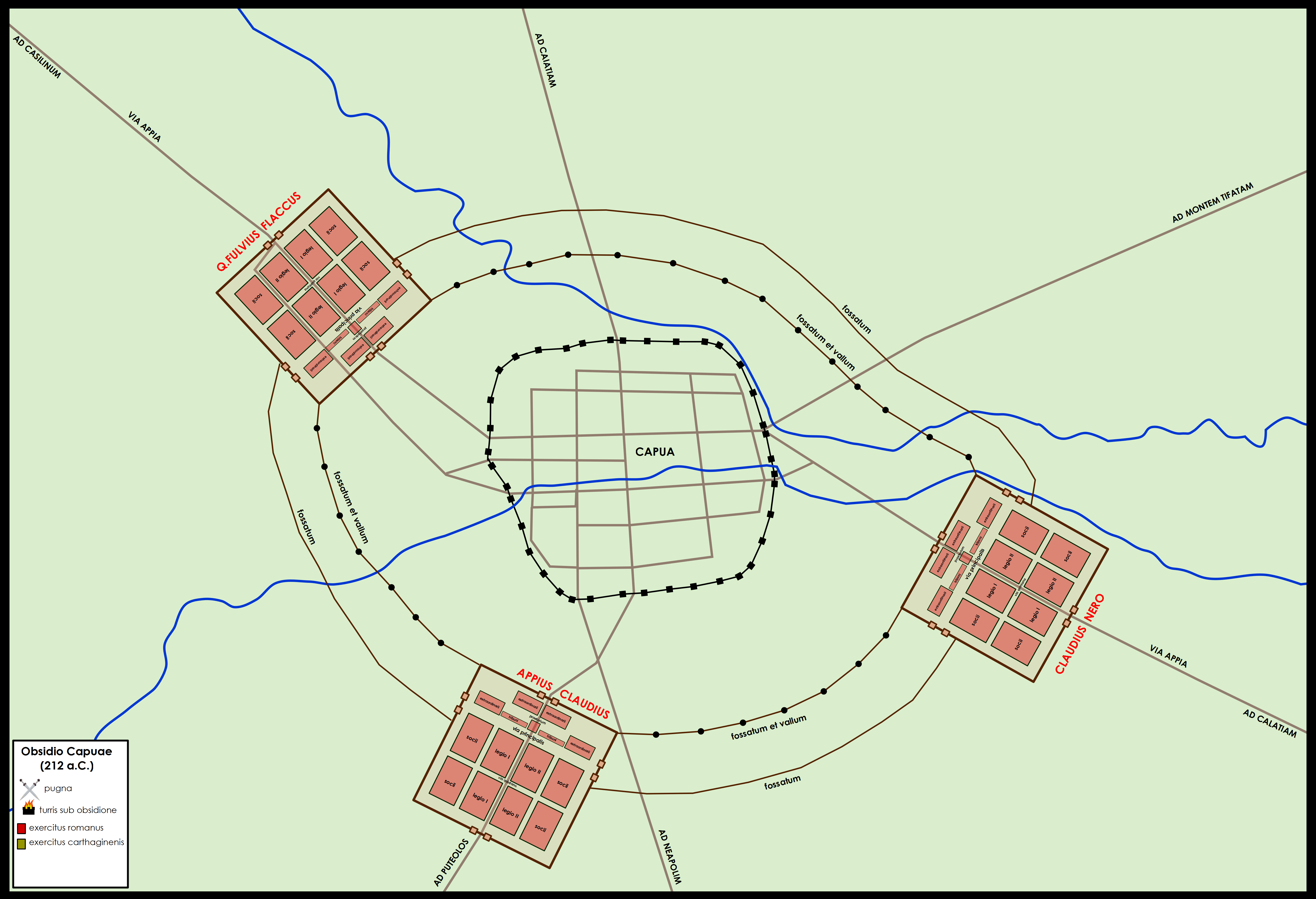
The fortification works of the Romans around Capua in 212 BC.

==== 212–211 BC ====
In the course of the Second Punic War, while Hannibal succeeded a first time in breaking the siege of the city of Capua (in 212 B.C.), the second time the Romans held firm in Campania. And although Hannibal had threatened to besiege Rome:

The Romans, who were besieged by Hannibal and in turn besieged Capua, arranged by decree for the army to hold that position until the city was conquered.

— Frontinus, Stratagemata, III, 18, 3.

And so Hannibal, noting that Rome's defenses were very strong and the Roman besiegers of Capua did not "break the siege," abandoned the Campanian city, which fell shortly thereafter into Roman hands.

==== 209 BC ====
In the midst of the Second Punic War, Publius Cornelius Scipio succeeded in conquering the Ibero-Carthaginian city of Cartagena (later renamed Nova Carthago), where an arsenal of launching machines amounting to 120 large catapults, 281 small ones, 23 large and 52 small ballistae, as well as a considerable number of scorpions were found inside.

=== Republican era: second period (200–30 BC) ===
==== 146 BC ====
During the Third Punic War, at the end of the siege of Carthage, Appian of Alexandria reports that the Romans of Publius Cornelius Scipio Aemilianus captured more than 2,000 throwing machines (including catapults, ballistae and scorpions) in the Carthaginian capital alone.

==== 134–133 BC ====
Sent to besiege Numantia, after many Roman failures, was Consul Publius Cornelius Scipio Aemilianus, hero of the Third Punic War. After sacking the country of the Vaccaei, he besieged the city. The army commanded by Scipio was supplemented by a large contingent of Numidian cavalry, supplied by the ally Micipsa, under whose command was the king's young nephew, Jugurtha. First, Scipio endeavored to hearten and reorganize the army discouraged by the stubborn and effective resistance of the rebellious city; then, in the certainty that the citadel could only be taken by starvation, he had a ring road built (a 10-kilometer wall all around it) apt to isolate Numantia and deprive it of any outside help. The consul then endeavored to discourage the Iberians from bringing aid to the rebellious city by appearing with his army at the gates of the city of Lutia and forcing it to submit and hand over hostages. After nearly a year of siege, the Numantines, by now starved, sought a bargain with Scipio, but, learning that he would accept nothing but unconditional surrender, the few men in fighting condition preferred to throw themselves into a last, desperate assault on the Roman fortifications. The failure of the sortie prompted the survivors, according to legend, to burn the city and throw themselves into the flames. The remains of the oppidum were razed to the ground like Carthage a few years earlier.

==== 87–86 BC ====
In the course of the First Mithridatic War, Lucius Cornelius Sulla besieged Athens for a long time, which fell into the hands of the Roman proconsul on March 1, 86 BCE.

==== 74–73 BC ====
During the Third Mithridatic War, Mithridates VI unsuccessfully besieged the Roman city of Cyzicus, which was liberated by the consular Lucius Licinius Lucullus.

==== Winter 73–72 BC ====
Lucius Licinius Lucullus proceeded to besiege some cities of the king of Pontus, Mithridates VI, including Themiscyra, which was located on the Thermodon River. Here Appian of Alexandria relates that the Romans built great towers, high mounds and dug tunnels so wide that whole great underground battles could be fought there. The inhabitants of the city then opened some tunnels that accessed those of the Romans, and they threw bears and other ferocious animals, as well as swarms of bees, into them against those who were working there. At the same time the Romans also besieged Amisus, using other methods of siege. There the inhabitants bravely repelled them, making frequent sorties, even challenging them in the open field, partly due to the substantial aid that Mithridates sent them, including weapons and soldiers, from Cabira.

==== 73–70 BC ====
Lucullus besieged the city of Amiso and after nearly three years succeeded in occupying the city. Two years later, in 68 B.C., it was the turn of Nisibis.

==== 63 BC ====
During Pompey's invasion of Judea, its capital city of Jerusalem was besieged and captured through a curious contrivance:

The great Temple was located on a hill and was defended by walls that encircled it all around. And if the Jews had defended it with the same constancy every day, Pompey would not have been able to conquer it. Instead, these neglected it on Saturday, during which no one works. Thus the Romans found an opportunity to conquer it.

— Cassius Dio, Roman History, XXXVII, 16.2.

==== 57 BC ====
In the course of his conquest of Gaul, Caesar, before the Belgae had recovered from the terror aroused by the recent massacre that had occurred to them near the Axona River, led the army into the lands of the Suessiones, arriving before their main oppidum, Noviodunum (near present-day Soissons and Pommiers). The city was besieged, but their king Galba, frightened by the magnitude of the siege works that the Roman general had managed to set up in such a short time, offered the surrender of his people. The capitulation, favored also by the intercession of the neighboring Remi, was sealed by the surrender of hostages (including two sons of King Galba) and all the weapons they held in their capital. And also this same year, having achieved a new victory in the battle of the Sabis, the Roman proconsul decided to march against the Atuatuci, who had all gathered in a single stronghold whose remarkable fortification was aided by the very nature of the places. (Note: This is possibly the oppidum of Namur, or the high ground of Falhize-sur-Meuse, in front of Huy, but other locations have also been proposed by scholars.) Thus Caesar describes the siege of the city (probably Namur):

Having this city all around very high cliffs [...] there remained only on one side a gently sloping access not more than 200 feet [about 65 meters] wide; in this place the Atuatuci had built a very high double wall and placed very heavy boulders and sharp beams there [...] and as soon as the Roman army arrived, the Atuatuci made frequent sorties from the city and fought small battles with ours. Further when they were encircled by a rampart that went around for 15,000 feet [about 4.5 km] and by numerous forts, they remained within the walls of their city. When they saw that, having approached the vineae, raised the embankment, a siege tower was being built, at first they mocked the Romans from their walls, why such a large machine had been built so far away [...] But when they saw that it was moving and approaching their walls, which was new and unusual for them, they sent ambassadors to Caesar to negotiate peace [... ] Caesar told them that he would save their nation more by custom than merit if they surrendered before the ram touched their walls, but that they should surrender their weapons [... ] threw from the walls a great quantity of weapons, so that the weapons piled up were as high as the top of the walls and embankment, but of one part was hidden in the city the third part [...] and for that day they remained at peace [...] As night fell Caesar ordered his soldiers to leave the city so that at night the inhabitants would not receive injustice from the soldiers. The Atuatuci, following a previously established plan [...] suddenly made a sortie after midnight from the city with all the troops at the point where it is easiest to ascend to the Roman fortifications [...] but having reported the fact quickly by means of fires, as Caesar had previously ordered, the Roman troops rushed in from the nearby castles. The enemies fought so valiantly and hard [...] against ours that from the rampart and towers they threw darts [...] killed about 4,000 enemies, the rest were driven back into the city. The next day, having forced the gates [...] and introduced our soldiers, Caesar put up for sale all the spoils of the city: [...] 53,000 people.

— Caesar, De bello Gallico, II, 29-33.

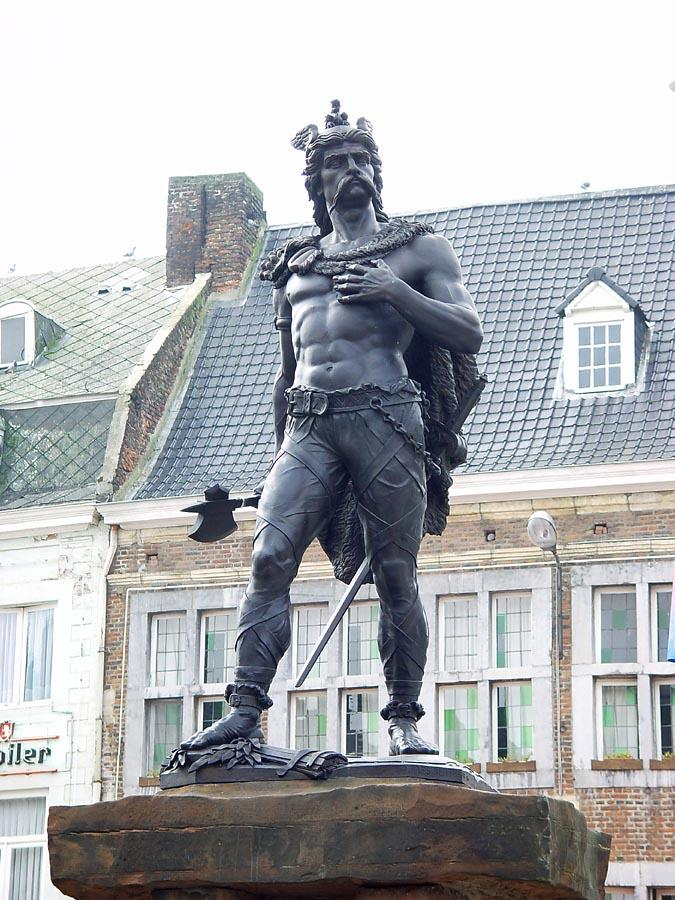
Statue of the Eburon chief, Ambiorix, placed in the square of the ancient city of Atuatuca, now Tongeren.

==== 54 BC ====
The legions, which were still quartered in their respective hiberna, were attacked by the Celtic people of the Eburones (Ardennes region). Such revolt was led by Ambiorix and Cativolcus. The Roman camp of the legates Quintus Titurius Sabinus and Lucius Aurunculeius Cotta, placed in all probability near Atuatuca, was attacked and completely surrounded. Ambiorix, having seen that the siege of the Roman castrum was difficult to attack and would in any case fall only at the cost of heavy losses among his own, decided to change tactics, succeeding in convincing the Romans by deception to leave the camp. When the Roman troops were in the open, in the middle of a wooded vallum, (Note: The valley of the clash between the Eburones and the Romans led by Cotta and Sabinus can be identified with the Geer River valley, 24 km southwest of Tongeren, as argued by L.A.Constans (in Guide Illustré des Campagnes de César en Gaule, Classical Journal, Vol. 25, No.9, Jun., 1930, p.57).) the Eburon army attacked them en masse and almost completely massacred one legion, (Note: Lawrence Keppie (The making of the roman army, from Republic to Empire, Oklahoma 1998, p.97 e seg.) argues that the legion lost, though soon afterwards reformed was legio XIIII.) five Roman cohorts and their commanders. Only a few survivors managed to reach Labienus' camp and warn him of what had happened. (Note: Caesar, De bello Gallico, V, 28-37. The incident is reminiscent of what happened sixty years later in Germania in the Teutoburg Forest, when three entire legions and their commander, Publius Quintilius Varus, were barbarously slaughtered by Germans led by Arminius.)

After this victory, Ambiorix succeeded in gaining the support of the Atuatuci, the Nervii and several smaller peoples such as the Ceutrones, the Grudi, the Levaci, the Pleumossi and the Geidunni, to besiege the camp of Quintus Cicero and his legion (attested at the oppidum of Namur). The siege lasted a couple of weeks, until Caesar himself arrived. In the course of this siege, which was particularly difficult for the Roman legion, the Gauls were able to implement siege techniques and tools similar to those of the Romans, from whom they had now learned them in part (partly due to Roman prisoners and deserters). Again Ambiorix tried to persuade the legate to abandon the camp, promising to protect his retreat. However, Quintus Cicero, unlike Sabinus, did not fall into the trap of the leader of the Eburones, although he did not know that as many as fifteen cohorts had been massacred shortly before, and he managed to hold out, amid enormous efforts and numerous human losses, until Caesar arrived. Meanwhile, Caesar, at the head of two legions he had managed to find after rejoining Gaius Fabius and Marcus Crassus, arrived in the vicinity of Cicero and learned from Cicero himself that the great mass of besiegers (about sixty thousand Gauls) was heading against Caesar. The proconsul, having built a camp with great rapidity, succeeded in beating back the attackers and putting them to flight, thus and finally freeing Cicero from the siege, by implementing a contrivance:

...just as the enemy Gauls were coming at him, [Caesar] feigned fear and held back his troops in the camp he had made smaller than usual. The Gauls, who now thought they had victory in their grasp, moved to plunder the Roman castrum, and began to fill in the moat and destroy the fences, but just when they were not ready to fight, Caesar brought out the legionaries from all parts of the camp and tore them to pieces.

— Frontinus, Stratagemata, III, 17, 6.

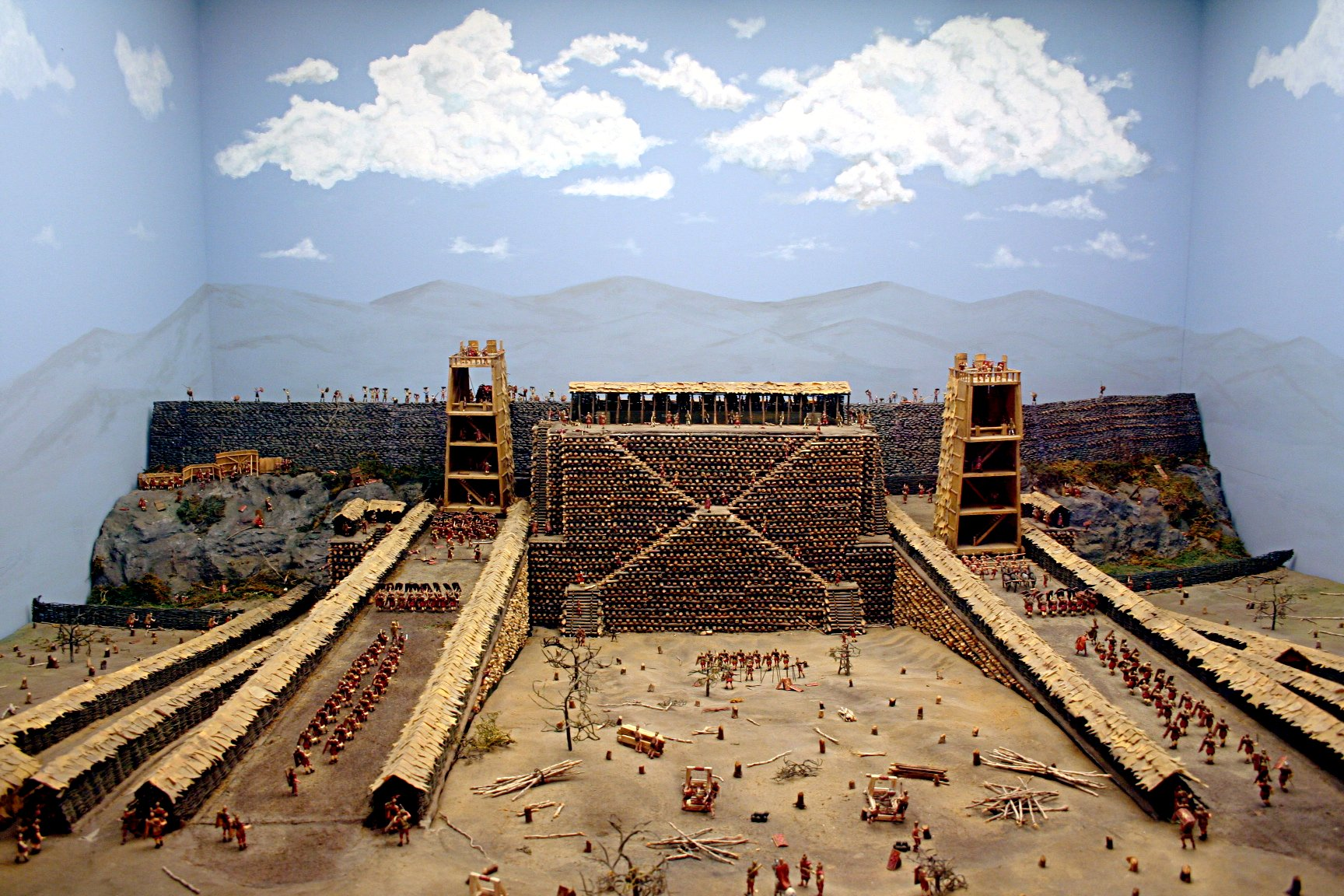
Reconstruction of the siege of Avaricum.

==== 52 BC ====
At Avaricum, since the nature of the place prevented the city from being encircled with a continuous fortified line, as was later possible at Alesia, Caesar had to build a gigantic siege ramp (nearly 100 meters wide and 24 meters high), at great expense of energy and loss of men because of the continuous sorties that the besieged men made while the Romans were intent on building, as Caesar himself recounts:

The great valor of the Roman soldiers was being opposed by contrivances of all kinds by the Gauls [...] They, in fact, used ropes to deflect the siege hooks and after securing them they would pull them in [...] they would remove the earth under the embankment with tunnels, with great skill since there were great iron mines in their country [...] they had also built wooden towers of several stories along all the walls and had covered them with skins [. ...] and with frequent sorties by day and night they set fire to the embankment or assaulted the legionaries engaged in building [...] they raised their towers to equal the towers of the Romans, as much as the embankment was raised daily [. ..] with fire-hardened timbers, with boiling pitch or very heavy stones they delayed the digging of the tunnels and prevented them from approaching the mura.

— Caesar, De bello Gallico, VII, 22.

Eventually, however, the Romans were able to break through the enemy defenses after 27 days of siege, when Caesar took advantage of a thunderstorm to bring one of the siege towers closer to the city walls, hiding many of the soldiers inside the vineae, and at the agreed signal managing to break through the city's ramparts with great speed.

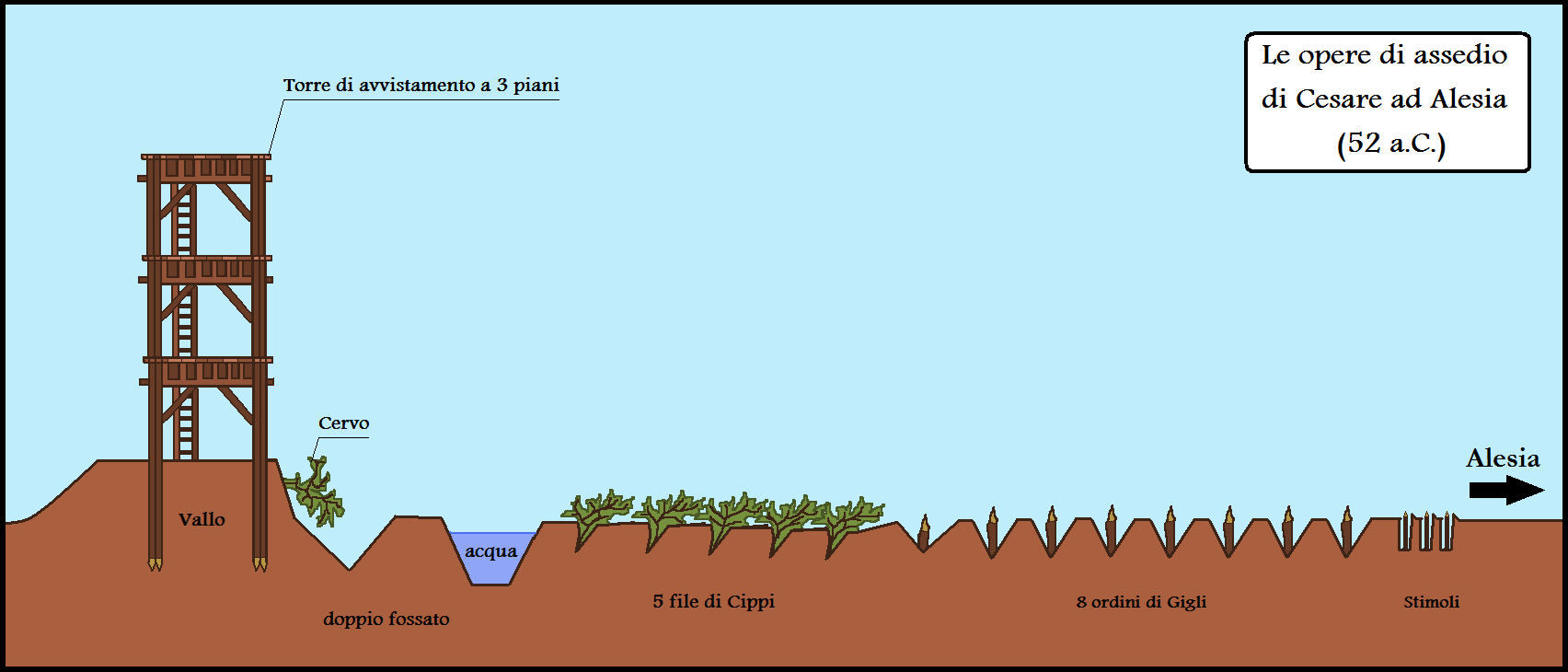
Graphic reconstruction of fortifications built by Caesar's group of engineers during the siege of Alesia (52 BC).

==== 52 BC ====
At Alesia, Caesar, in order to ensure a perfect blockade of the besieged, ordered the construction of a series of fortifications, called a "contravallation" (inner) and a "circumvallation" (outer), around the Gallic oppidum. These works were completed in record time in three weeks, the first "contravallation" of fifteen kilometers all around the enemy oppidum (equal to ten Roman miles) and, outside it, for another nearly twenty-one kilometers (equal to fourteen miles). The works also included two valli (one outer and one inner) surmounted by a palisade; two pits, the nearest of which to the fortification, was filled with water from the surrounding rivers; a whole series of traps and deep holes, from the "cervus" at the front of the rampart under the palisade, to five orders of "cippus," eight of "lilies," and numerous "stimuli." nearly a thousand watchtowers manned by Roman artillery, twenty-three forts ("castella"), four large camps for legions (two for each castrum) and four camps for the cavalry, legionary, auxiliary and Germanic legions.

==== 49 BC ====
It is known from Caesar that during the siege of Brundisium he determined to block the exits from the harbor. At the mouth of the harbor, which is narrower, he had an embankment laid along both shores, as the sea at that point was shallow. A little further on, because of the increasing depth, he had pairs of rafts inserted on the extension of the seawall, the side of which was thirty feet. After positioning them well, he added others of equal size, covering them as if they were the natural extension of the embankment, so that they could be easily accessed in case of their defense. On the outside and along the two sides they were protected by latticework and plutei, while two-story towers were erected every four rafts, to better defend the fortification work from possible assaults by enemy ships and fires.

During the subsequent siege of Massilia, a number of musculi were employed, the size of which was about 60 feet long (equal to about 18 meters).

=== Early imperial era: offensive phase (30 BC–211 AD) ===
==== 24 BC ====
The Roman expedition to Arabia Felix brought a Roman army, under the command of the governor of Egypt, Aelius Gallus, along the routes to India as far as Yemen. At the end of a long journey that lasted six months, Gallus reached the city called Marsiaba or Mariaba (present-day Ma'rib in Yemen), which belonged to the tribe of Rhammanitae, whose king was a certain Ilasarus. The city was besieged for six days, but managed to hold out, aided by the lack of water from the Roman besiegers. Gallus was thus forced to stop only two days' march from the spice-producing country and to take the remains of his battered army, worn out by thirst, hunger and disease, back to Egypt.

67

During the early phases of the First Jewish Revolt, Vespasian's Galilee campaign of 67 AD centered on a series of sieges against fortified Jewish towns. The first major siege came at the hilltop town of Yodfat, which fell in June or July after holding out for 47 days; defenders under the command of Josephus used boulders and boiling oil against the attackers, in what is recorded as the earliest known use of that tactic, and arrowheads and ballista stones recovered at the site attest to the fighting. When the city fell, the Romans reportedly massacred those caught outside and hunted down survivors in hiding; Josephus claimed 40,000 deaths, though modern estimates put the toll closer to 2,000 killed. Additionally, 1,200 women and infants were reportedly captured.

The coastal town of Tarichaea also resisted, with Josephus reporting that residents were drawn into the fight by an influx of outsiders rather than by their own initiative. After the town fell, surviving rebels fled onto the Sea of Galilee, where Roman forces defeated them in naval skirmishes that Josephus says left 6,700 dead and the lake filled with bodies. In the aftermath, Vespasian separated local prisoners from the "foreigners" blamed for inciting the revolt; 1,200 of the latter were executed in Tiberias's stadium, 6,000 young men were sent to labor on the Corinth Canal, others were handed to pro-Roman king Agrippa II, and 30,400 were sold into slavery.

The campaign's longest siege was at Gamla, a fortified town on a steep promontory in the southern Golan Heights, which held out for six weeks in the fall of 67 before falling in late October with heavy Roman casualties; the city was never resettled. Archaeological finds there include armor fragments, arrowheads, and hundreds of ballista and catapult stones, and the town's synagogue appears to have been converted into a refuge area, with cookpots, storage jars, and fireplaces found buried beneath ballista stones. Josephus claimed only two women survived the siege, with the rest either killed by Roman forces or dying by throwing themselves into ravines.

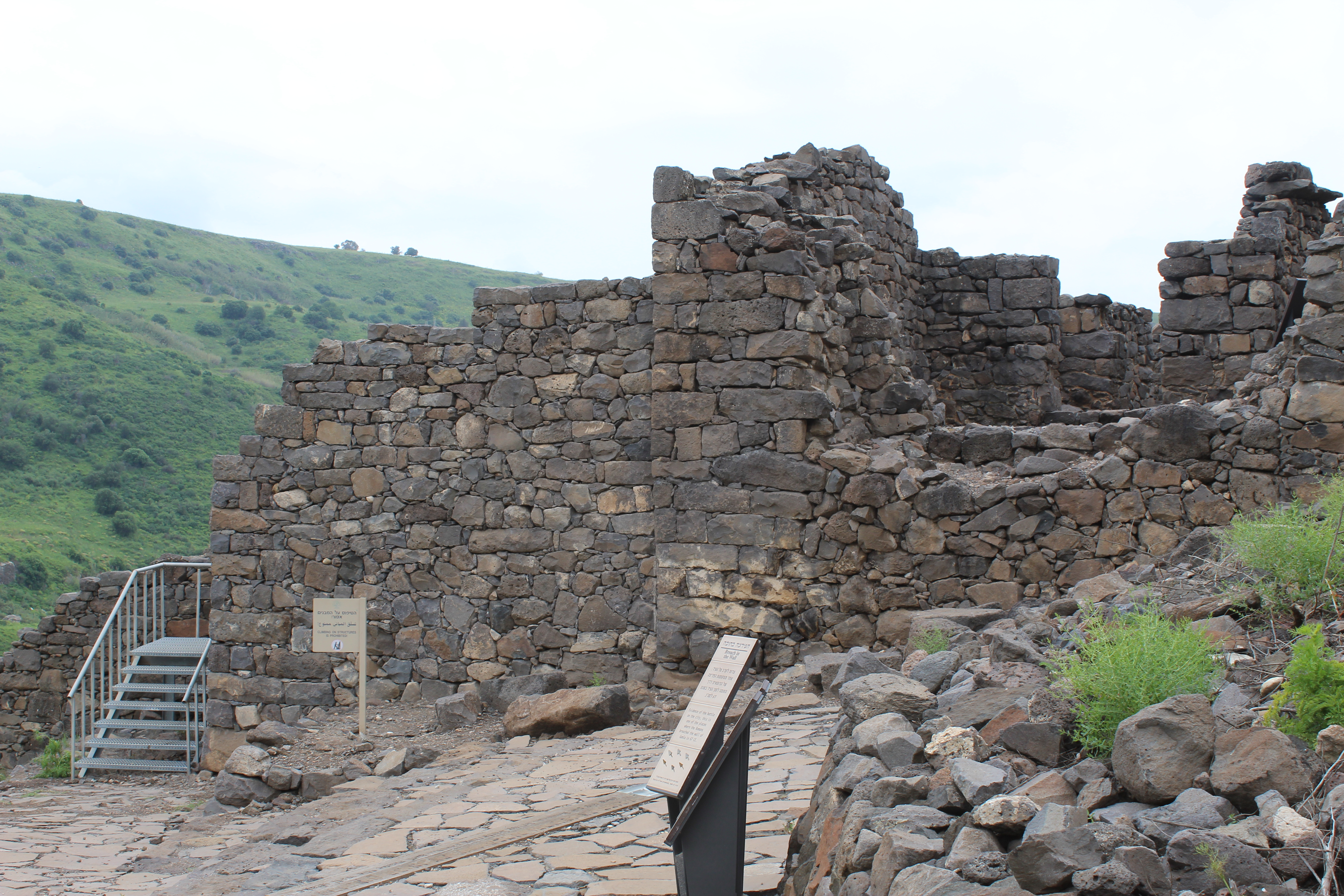
Gamla, a fortified Jewish town in the Golan, fell to Vespasian in October 67 AD. The image shows the main breach in the town's wall

While not clearly attested in Josephus's work, another site appears to have been besieged by the Romans in 67 as part of the campaign to suppress the First Jewish Revolt: Khirbet el-Hammam, possibly the ancient Narbata, a city located in the Samarian highlands. There, archaeologists have found what appears to be a circumvallation wall (1,516 meters of which survive today) along with an apparent assault ramp and military camps.

==== 69 ====
In the course of the civil war that broke out after Nero's death to succeed him, the city of Cremona was besieged twice: first, unsuccessfully, by the Vitellians against the supporters of Otho (March); secondly by the Flavians against the Vitellians (late October), leading the same legions loyal to the future emperor, Vespasian, to a rampant sacking of the city for a full four days.

Forty thousand armed men raided Cremona, with even greater numbers of servants and bearers, people very much given to cruelty and disorder. No one was protected by age or rank. Rapes and killings took place. Very old men and women were dragged as objects of ridicule.... If any young maiden of particular beauty happened to be on their hands, they were torn to pieces.... Someone carrying away money or golden votive gifts from temples was killed by another stronger than him... others dug up treasures, beating with rods and torturing their masters... soldiers equipped with torches, after stealing their prey threw them for fun inside houses...

— Tacitus, Historiae, III, 33.

==== 70 ====
The First Jewish War had in the siege of Jerusalem the "key" operation in the Roman victory. It is said that the future emperor Titus first built around the besieged city in addition to a large camp, used as headquarters, thirteen forts connected by a contravallation of almost 8 km and as many as 5 siege ramps. He then attempted to reduce the food and water supplies of the besieged, allowing pilgrims to enter the city for the customary Pesach temple visit, but preventing them from leaving. In mid-May, Titus succeeded in destroying the third wall with battering rams and then breaking through the second wall as well. The next target was Antonia Fortress, located north of the Temple Mount, forcing the Romans to fight street by street against the Zealots. And after an initial attempt to negotiate peace, the besieged managed to prevent the construction of siege towers near Antonia Fortress, but food and water began to run out. Thus it was that small groups of resuppliers managed to penetrate between the Roman lines of the besiegers, and smuggle some supplies into the city.

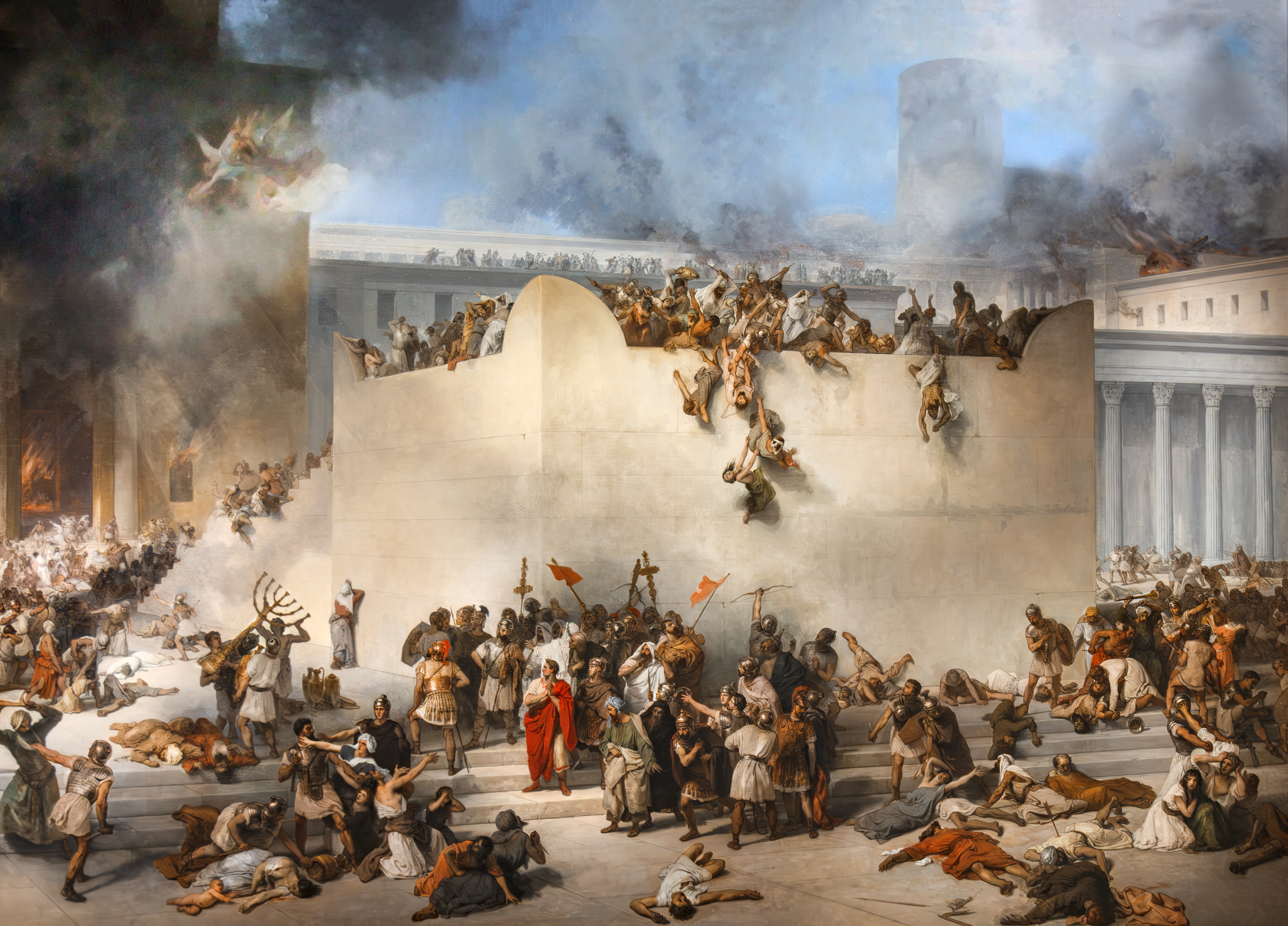
The destruction of the Temple, from a painting by Francesco Hayez preserved in Venice, was the last act of the great siege of Jerusalem.

To permanently stop supplies from outside, Titus decided to erect a wall all around the city and, at the same time, to resume construction of the siege towers. Finally after further unsuccessful attempts to scale and penetrate the walls of Antonia Fortress, the Romans managed to sneak in, surprising the zealot guards deep in sleep, allowing them to conquer the fortress, which provided a perfect platform for attacking the temple itself. The rams apparently had little success, but subsequent fighting succeeded in setting fire to the walls. The flames spread quickly and soon the Temple was destroyed, while the fire spread to nearby residential neighborhoods, so that the Roman legions were able to crush the remaining Jewish resistance, albeit after the construction of new siege towers. It was September 7, and Jerusalem had fallen to the Romans.

==== 71/72 ====
After the fall of Jerusalem to Titus, the First Jewish Revolt was largely pacified, save for three major desert fortresses, which remained the last pockets of resistance still held by Jewish rebels. The task of subduing them fell to the province's new legate, Sextus Lucilius Bassus. Herodium, a palace-fortress south of Jerusalem, seems to have surrendered with little resistance. Bassus next moved across the Jordan River to take Machaerus, building a circumvallation wall, camps, and an unfinished siege ramp, remnants of which survive today. The defenders reportedly surrendered only after watching the Romans threaten to crucify Eleazar, a young nobleman captured outside the walls, and won a promise of safe passage in exchange. The Romans killed every non-Jew at the site, with only a handful managing to escape.

==== 73/74 ====
In the winter of either 72/73 or 73/74 CE, Lucius Flavius Silva, Bassus's successor, led approximately 8,000 troops against Masada, a secluded mountain-top fortress in the Judaean Desert that had become the final holdout of the Jewish revolt. The siege of Masada is said to have lasted for a long time, in the course of which all possible techniques were adopted to achieve final victory, starting with the construction of eight forts around the fortress (six small and two large ones), connected by a 3,6 km contravallation, as well as a gigantic ramp (200 cubits high between earth and stone, plus 50 cubits of a wooden platform) topped by a 60-cubit-high tower, all covered with iron, from the top of which the Romans placed catapults and ballistae and a large ram.

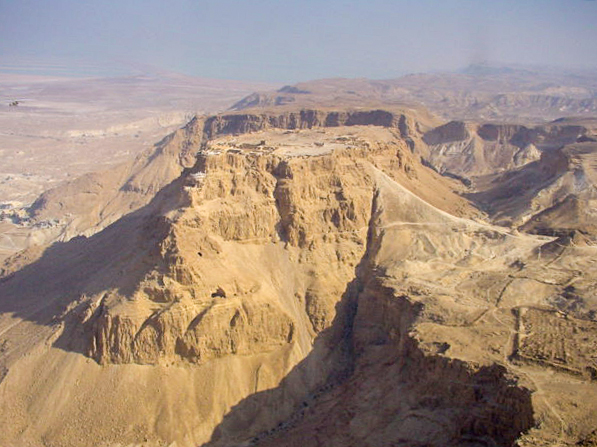
The siege of Masada, the last stronghold of the Jewish revolt, which fell into Roman hands in 74.

According to Josephus's account, the Sicarii leader, Eleazar Ben Yair, eventually addressed his people, inducing them to commit collective suicide given the now desperate situation. When the Romans reached the top of the fortress, they found the besieged all dead.

==== 106 ====
During the last year of the campaign in Dacia by Emperor Trajan, the Dacian king Decebalus, attacked from two fronts as also depicted on the Column (perhaps from the side of the "Iron Gates" and from that of the Red Tower Pass), put up such desperate resistance that the Romans left numerous dead and wounded on the field, victims of the fierce combativeness of the Dacians. Eventually, after a long and bloody siege, Sarmizegetusa Regia also capitulated under the blows of the Roman armies assembled in the late summer of that year. The salient phases of this siege are also depicted on the Trajan Column, in which the final suicide that the Dacian leaders inflicted on themselves to avoid being taken prisoner by the Romans is also depicted. Eventually all the fortified strongholds in the Orăștie area fell, one after the other: from Popești to Cetățeni, Piatra Neamț, Pecica, Piatra Craivii, Căpâlna, Costești, Bănița, Bălănești up to Tilișca. During these campaigns, in addition to the usual siege machines, numerous rostral tortoises, carroballistae, and cheiroballistrae, as depicted on the Column, were used.

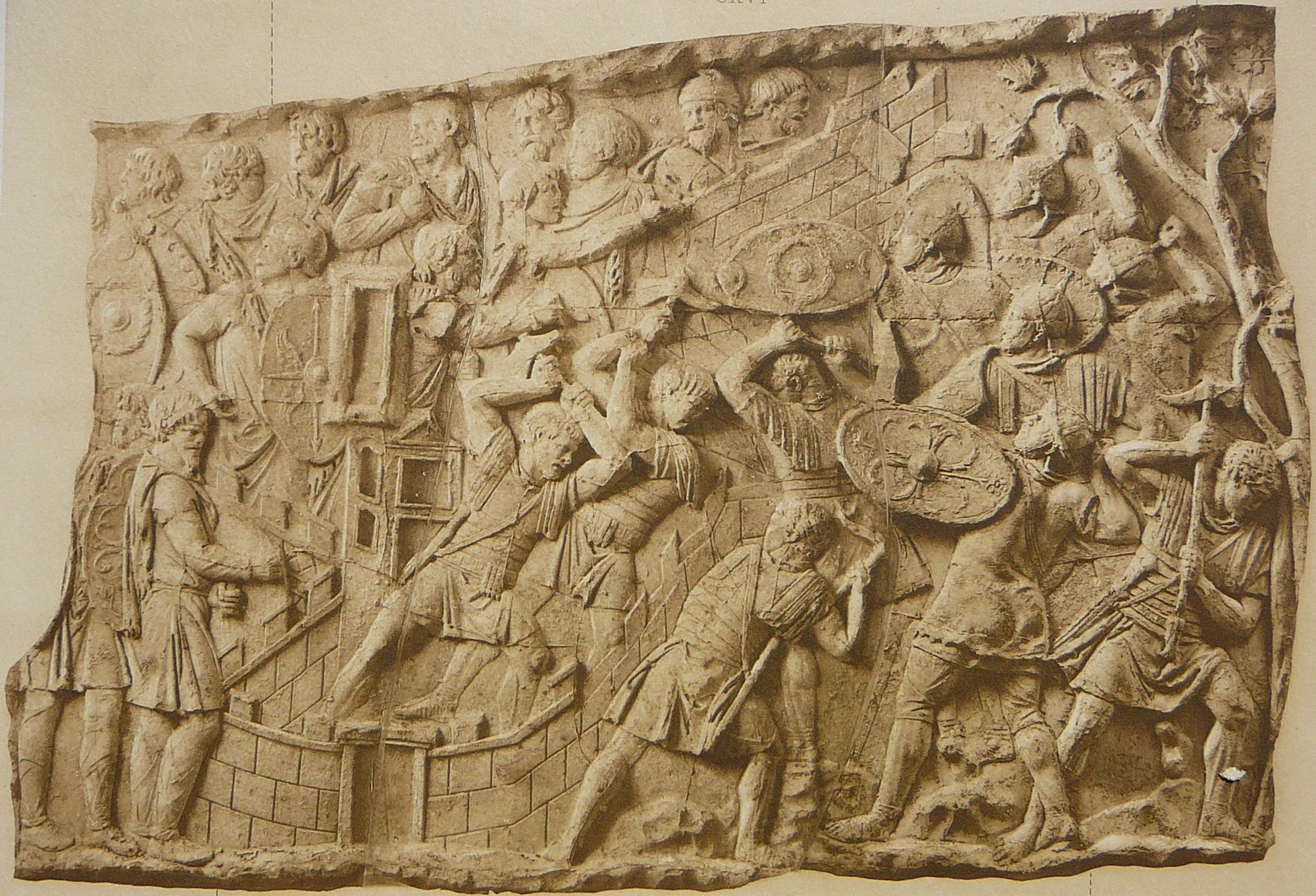
The scene appears to depict the 106 siege of Sarmizegetusa Regia, shortly before Decebalus' final surrender and the Roman conquest of Dacia.

==== 116 ====
Trajan, in the course of his Parthian campaigns, succeeded in besieging and conquering their capital, Ctesiphon, but not the important stronghold of Hatra.

==== 135 ====
In 135, the Romans besieged Betar, a fortified town in the Judaean Mountains that had served as the headquarters of the Jewish rebels during the Bar Kokhba Revolt, chosen for its defensible position, proximity to Jerusalem, and access to springs. After a series of military setbacks, the rebel commander Simon bar Kokhba withdrew his remaining forces there, where defenders hastily raised fortifications around the settlement. The Romans encircled the position with a siege wall and established two camps to the south, likely severing access to the site's main water source. The fighting was intense, slingstones and arrowheads have been found along the fortification wall, yet the Romans stormed the site without needing a siege ramp. Large quantities of stockpiled slingstones were found unused, suggesting the position fell before its munitions were exhausted. Betar fell in the summer of 135. Jewish tradition holds it was breached on Tisha B'Av (in July/August), the same date of the destruction of the two Temples in Jerusalem. Lamentations Rabbah, a late rabbinic source, describes the slaughter at Betar in hyperbolic terms: blood filled the streets until horses drowned in it up to their nostrils, and flowed so abundantly that it carried heavy boulders into the sea — despite the town lying forty miles from the coast. The site was destroyed and never rebuilt.

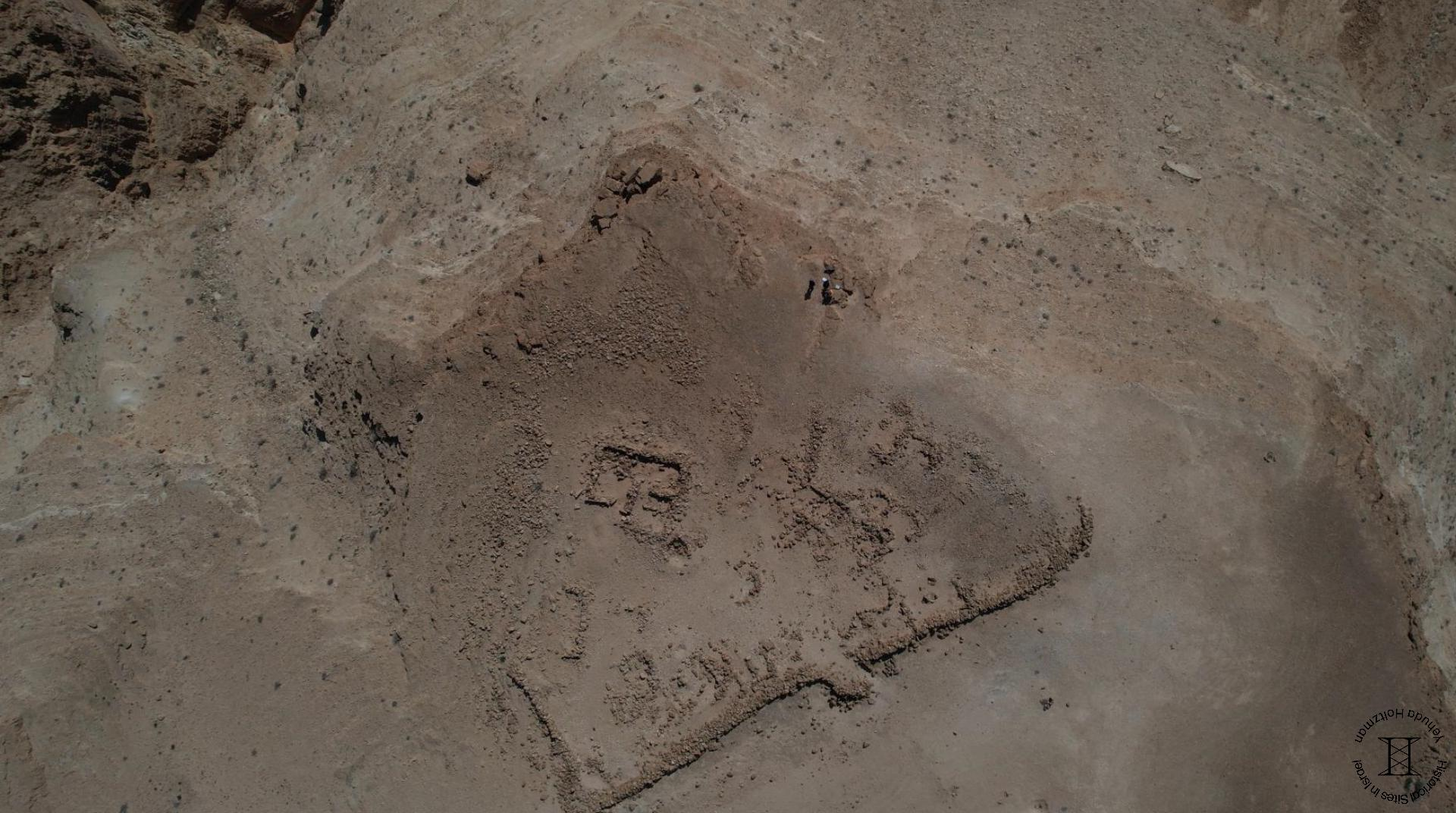
Aerial view of the Roman siege camp situated on the cliff above the Cave of Letters, a Bar Kokhba-era refuge cave in the Judaean Desert

During the Bar Kokhba Revolt's later phases, Jewish refugees sheltered in remote cliff caves in the Judaean Desert such as the Cave of Letters and the Cave of Horrors, hoping for better survival odds than in open battle. Roman forces besieged roughly half these caves, building camps above them to cut off supplies and starve out the defenders; skeletal remains and arrowheads show that some died of hunger and thirst, while others were killed in assaults.

==== 165 ====
Lucius Verus, in the course of his Parthian campaigns, succeeded in besieging and conquering their capital, Ctesiphon.

==== 169-170 ====
One of the major cities of the Roman Empire, Aquileia, was forced to endure a siege by a never-before-seen mass of barbarians (mainly Quadi, Marcomanni, and Hasdingi Vandals), who had spread devastatingly into northern Italy, in the heart of Venetia. The impression caused was enormous: it had been since the time of Marius (102-101 B.C.) that a barbarian population had not besieged centers in northern Italy.

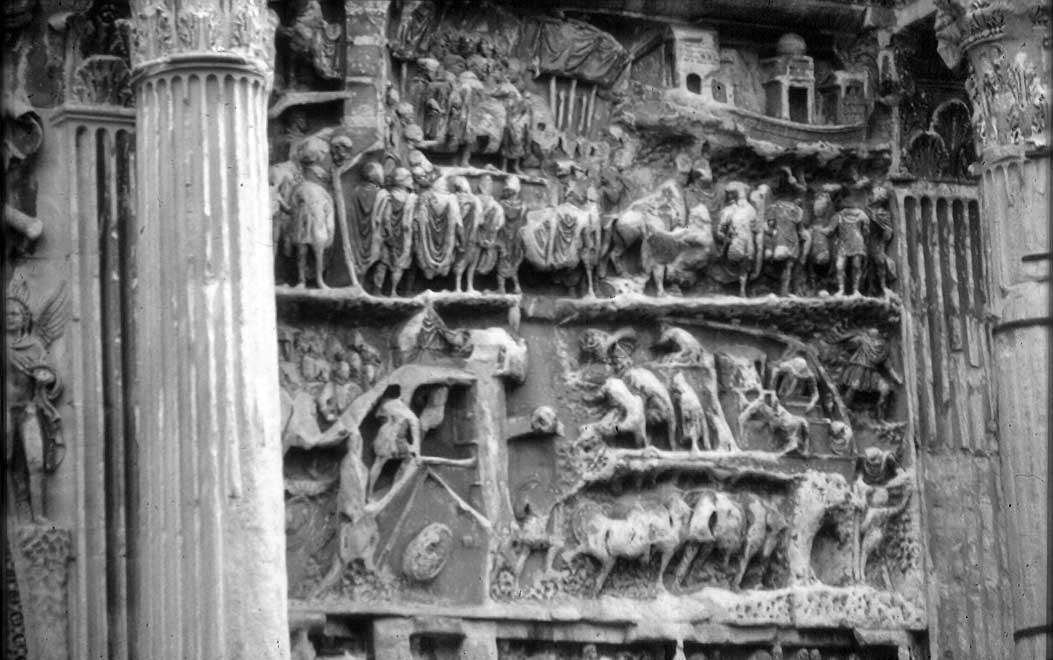
Relief of the Arch of Septimius Severus in the Roman Forum, where the Siege and Taking of Ctesiphon is depicted (marble 4.90 x 4 meters).

==== 197 ====
Septimius Severus, in the course of his Parthian campaigns, succeeded in besieging and conquering their capital, Ctesiphon. Severus's armies, after crossing the Euphrates for the second time, near Zeugma, headed with great siege machines for Edessa, which opened its gates wide to him, sending him high dignitaries and banners as an act of submission. Severus continued his advance with a large fleet along the Euphrates, where he reached and subdued first Dura Europos, then Seleucia, putting the cataphract cavalry of the Parthians to flight. The advance continued with the capture of Babylon, which had shortly before been abandoned by enemy forces, and, toward the end of the year, the Parthian capital itself, Ctesiphon, was also placed under siege. The city, now surrounded, tried unsuccessfully to resist the impressive military machine the Roman emperor had managed to put together (some 150,000 armed men). When it was now close to capitulation, King Vologases V abandoned his people and fled to the interior of his territories. The city was sacked as had happened in the past in the time of Trajan (in 116) and Lucius Verus (in 165).

=== Early imperial era: defensive phase (211–285 AD) ===
==== 229–230 ====
With the crisis of the 3rd century, the sides between Rome and the barbarians/Sasanids began to reverse: more and more cities in the Roman Empire were besieged by forces outside the imperial borders. In 229, with the accession to the throne of the first Sasanian ruler, Ardashir I, the Persian armies besieged, albeit to no avail, the "client" city of Hatra (to make it a base of attack against the Romans).

==== 238 ====
Emperor Maximinus Thrax, having arrived in Aquileia, located at the crossroads of important communication routes and a depot for the food and equipment needed by the soldiers, was forced to place the city under siege, as he had closed its gates to the emperor (after rebuilding part of its ancient walls), at the behest of the Senate of Rome. This allowed his opponents to get organized, as Pupienus did by reaching the city of Ravenna, from which he directed the defense of the besieged city. Although the ratio of forces was still in Maximinus' advantage, the prolonged siege, the shortage of provisions and the strict discipline imposed by the emperor caused the troops' hostility toward the emperor, so much so that the soldiers of Legio II Parthica, first tore his images from the military insignia, to signal his deposition, then assassinated him in his camp, along with his son Maximus (May 10).

==== 237–240 ====
In the course of Ardashir I's Mesopotamian campaigns, the cities of the Roman province of Mesopotamia, Nisibis and Carrhae, were besieged and occupied by the Sasanians in late 237/early 238. The following year a new invasion by Sasanian armies laid siege to the fortress-city of Dura Europos, a Roman outpost on the Euphrates. In 240, Ardashir I finally succeeded in the feat of occupying and destroying the important Roman-allied city-stronghold of Hatra, then occupying much of Roman Mesopotamia, perhaps even going so far as to besiege and occupy Antioch of Syria.

==== 248–250 ====
With the continuing barbarian invasions of the third century, the Roman Empire was now placed "under siege." During 248 a new incursion of Goths, who had been refused the annual contribution promised by Gordian III, and of Carpi, their associates, once again brought devastation to the province of Lower Moesia. The invasion was stopped by a general of Philip the Arab, Trajan Decius, future emperor, at the city of Marcianopolis, which had remained under siege for a long time. The surrender was also made possible by the Germans' ignorance of siege machinery and probably, as Jordanes suggests, "by the sum paid to them by the inhabitants." The following year (in 249) a new invasion of Goths pushed into Thrace as far as Philippopolis (present-day Plovdiv), where they besieged the governor Titus Julius Priscus, In 250, the emperor Decius managed to surprise and defeat the Goths of Cniva while the latter had been besieging the Mesic city of Nicopolis for several months.

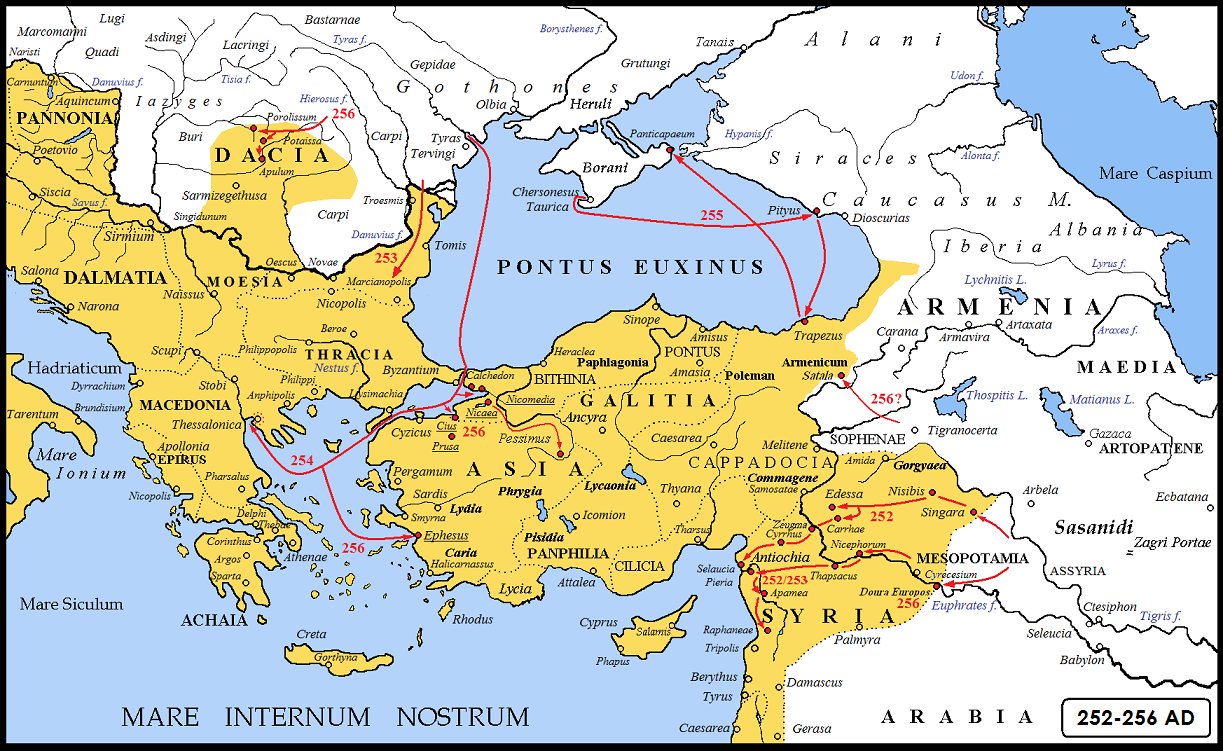
Barbarian invasions of Goths, Borans, Carpi, contemporary with those of the Sasanids of Shapur I, from the years 252-256, during the reign of Valerian and Gallienus.

==== 252–257 ====
Shapur I, Sasanian king, organized a violent offensive against the eastern provinces of the Roman Empire. The Persian troops occupied first the province of Mesopotamia, and then took possession of Antioch after a difficult siege, where they plundered a large amount of booty, dragging numerous prisoners with them. It is reported that in addition to the capital of Syria (in 252/253), other important strongholds were taken from Roman rule such as Carrhae, Nisibis (in 252) and Dura Europos (in 256), forcing Emperor Valerian to intervene.

==== 260 ====
Along the Limes of Germania Inferior hordes of Franks succeeded in seizing the legionary fortress of Castra Vetera and besieged Cologne, sparing Augusta Treverorum (today's Trier) instead. At the same time along the eastern front Edessa was besieged seemingly to no avail, while Tarsus (in Cilicia), Antioch (in Syria) and Caesarea (in Cappadocia) fell under the blows of the Sasanian armies of Shapur I, in addition to the entire Roman Mesopotamia.

==== 262 ====
The Goths made a new sea raid along the Black Sea coast, succeeding in besieging and sacking Byzantium, ancient Ilion and Ephesus.

Because the Scythians [i.e., the Goths, ed.] had brought great destruction to Hellas and besieged Athens itself, Gallienus sought to fight them, who by then had occupied Thrace.

— Zosimus, New History, I, 39.1.

==== Late 267–early 268 ====
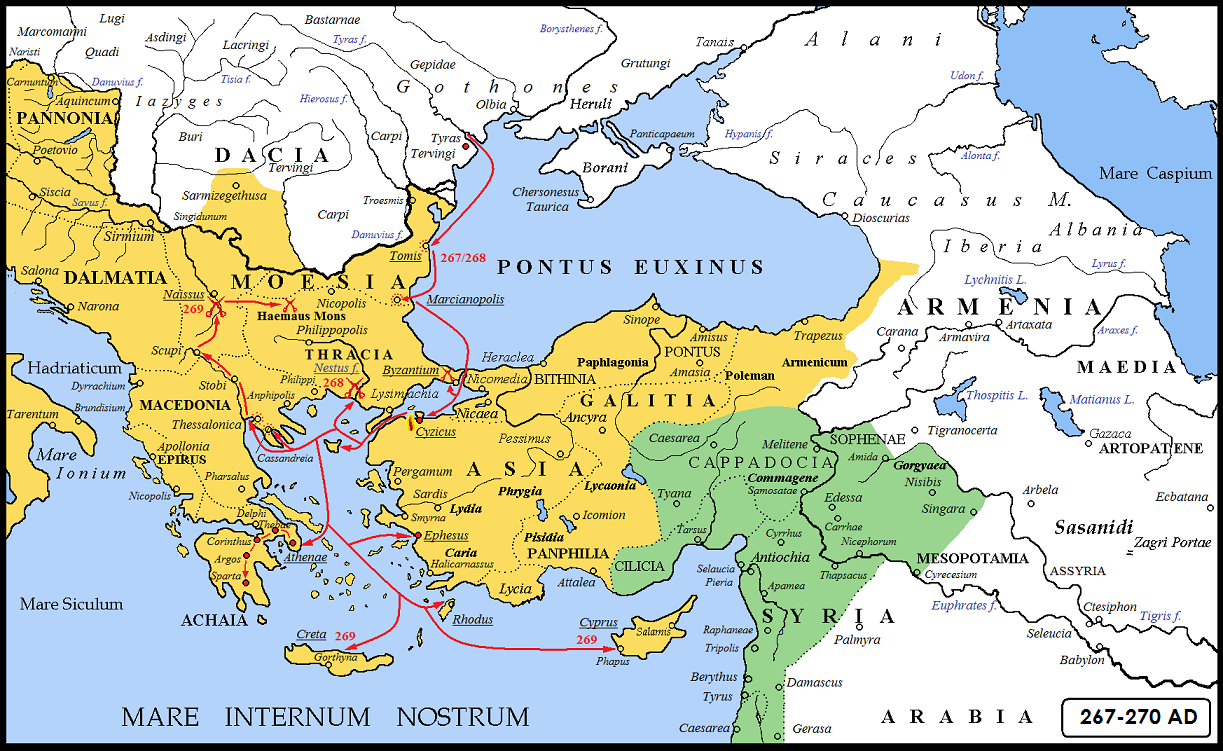
The invasion of the Gothic peoples of 267/268-270 during the reigns of Gallienus and Claudius the Gothic. In green color the Palmyrene Empire of Queen Zenobia and Vaballathus.

A new and immense invasion by the Goths, together with the Peucini, the "latest arrivals" in the region of the present-day Azov Sea, the Heruli, and numerous other peoples took shape from the mouth of the Tyras River (near the city of the same name) and began the most astonishing invasion of this third century, which shook the coasts and hinterland of the Roman provinces of Asia Minor, Thracia, and Achaia facing the Pontus Euxinus and the Aegean Sea. They succeeded in laying siege to numerous imperial cities, beginning with Cyzicus, albeit unsuccessfully, but later occupying the future city of Chrysopolis (opposite Byzantium), and laying new sieges to the cities of Cassandreia and Thessalonica, and bringing devastation to the hinterland of the province of Macedonia as well.

==== 268 ====
Emperor Gallienus was forced to return to Italy to besiege the usurper Aureolus, who had attempted to usurp his throne, in Milan.

==== 269 ====
The untimely death of Claudius the Goth forced Aurelian to quickly conclude the war against the Goths in Thrace and the Moesias, ending the sieges of Anchialus (near modern Pomorie, along the Bulgarian Black Sea coast), and Nicopolis ad Istrum.

==== 272 ====
Emperor Aurelian put an end to Zenobia's reign when, after liberating the city of Antioch, he defeated the Palmyrian army first at Immae and then at Emesa, going so far as to besiege Palmyra itself, which was shortly conquered. The queen was caught up on the banks of the Euphrates River and captured along with her son.

==== 278 ====
Emperor Probus went, at the end of that year, to Isauria to put down an uprising of brigands (with a final siege at their stronghold of Cremna in Pisidia).

=== Late imperial era (286-476 AD) ===
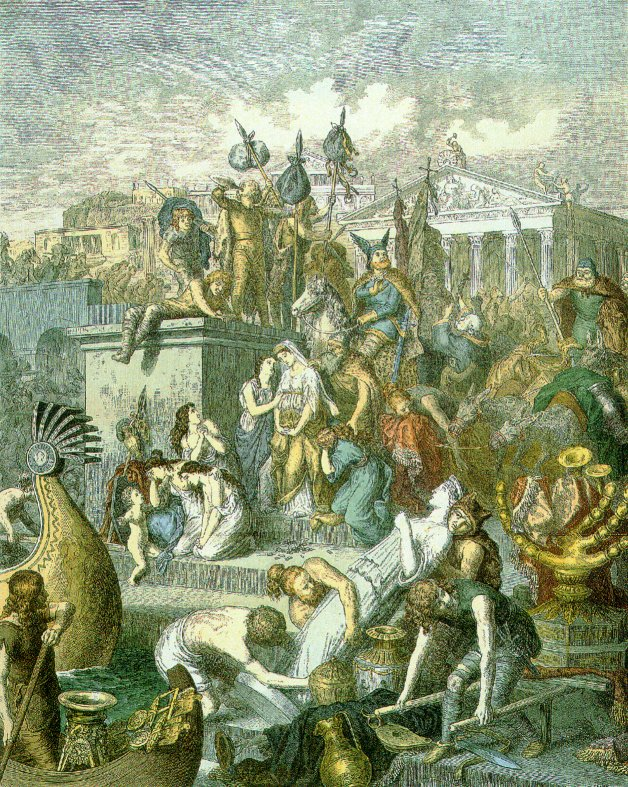
Genseric's Vandals sack Rome, as depicted in the painting above.

The Roman Empire, after the crisis of the third century with the period of military anarchy, but especially after the defeat of Adrianople in 378, was placed under siege by the barbarian populations pressing along its borders from the north, and by the Sasanian Empire from the east.

==== 337/338 ====
Shortly after the death of Constantine I, the Sasanian king, Shapur II, resumed hostilities and besieged Nisibis unsuccessfully (something that had happened in the past in 326, and also happened in 346 and 350). It is reported that the city managed to repel the invader thanks to the people, led by the city's bishop.

==== 359 ====
Shapur II succeeded, after a siege lasting seventy-three days, in occupying the city of Amida, although numerous attacks brought with the great siege machines were repeatedly repulsed, with severe damage to the Persians and the machines themselves. The Romans capitulated when they found themselves fighting not only the Sasanian enemy but also a plague. The now exhausted city eventually fell as a result of a night attack, carried simultaneously by Shapur and Grumbates with siege towers and incendiary arrows.

==== 363 ====
In the course of Julian's Sasanian campaign, since the Romans lacked the necessary siege machinery, and it was, therefore, not possible to take Ctesiphon in a reasonable time, Julian, in order to avoid being surrounded by Shapur II, decided to "break the siege" and move toward northern Mesopotamia, to reunite with Procopius' contingent.

==== 402 ====
The general of the Western Roman Empire, Stilicho, succeeded in liberating Milan from the siege of Alaric's Visigoths, managing to beat them shortly afterwards near Pollentia.

==== 408-410 ====
Visigoth king Alaric laid siege to the city of Rome three times during these years, until he succeeded in sacking it in 410, some eight hundred years after the previous Gallic sack of 390/386 BC. It is reported that the Visigoths first blocked all access routes, including the Tiber and supplies from the port of Ostia, at the same time the siege lasted non-stop for five months, forcing the starving population to even feed on cats, rats, and dogs. Infectious diseases claimed many victims (sources speak of plague, but it was more likely cholera) and incidents of cannibalism are also mentioned. The siege mainly affected the poorer sections of the population, and it was probably a desperate group of starving people who decided to end the siege. On the night of August 24, 410, the Salarian Gate was opened to the besiegers (who evidently did not have adequate siege machines), and Rome was sacked.

==== 411 ====
The usurper Constantine was besieged at Arles by Gerontius, where, however, another of Honorius' generals, the vigorous Flavius Constantius (the future emperor Constantius III), also arrived. Although Gerontius was defeated and put to flight, Constantius continued the siege until Constantine was forced to surrender. The defeated usurper, however, did not reach Honorius' court alive.

==== 443 ====
Attila's Hunnic armies turned their attention to the Eastern Roman Empire, carrying out raids along the Danube, eventually occupying the important Roman fortresses of Ratiaria and Naissus (now Niš), the Barbarians themselves using siege machines such as battering rams and tall towers. It is said that when Attila attacked and devastated Naissus, the city's river banks were covered with an impressive number of corpses.

==== 455 ====
The barbarians succeeded in laying siege to and then sacking the city of Rome. These were the Vandals of Genseric, then at war with Emperor Petronius Maximus. It is said that Genseric set sail with his powerful fleet from Carthage, sailed up the Tiber, and then succeeded in sacking it. When the Vandals arrived, Pope Leo I implored the barbarian king not to destroy the ancient city or kill its inhabitants. Genseric agreed. He entered through the Porta Portuensis and plundered a large amount of gold, silver and many other valuables with greater impetus than Alaric's Visigoths forty-five years earlier.

== See also ==
- Roman siege engines
- Ancient warfare

== Bibliography ==
- Ammianus Marcellinus. Histories.
- Appian. Historia Romana (Ῥωμαϊκά).
- Aurelius Victor. De Caesaribus.
- Cassius Dio. Roman History.
- Caesar. Commentarii de bello Gallico.
- Caesar. Commentarii de bello civili.
- Diodorus Siculus. Bibliotheca historica.
- Herodian. History of the empire after Marcus Aurelius, VI-VIII.
- Eutropius. Breviarium ab Urbe condita. Vol. III.
- Fasti triumphales AE 1930, 60.
- Florus. Epitoma of Livy bellorum omnium annorum DCC.
- Frontinus. Strategemata, II.
- Jordanes. Getica.
- George Syncellus, Extract of Chronography.
- Flavius Josephus. The Jewish War, V.
- Historia Augusta.
- Livy. Ab Urbe condita libri.
- Livy. Periochae. Vol. 21–30.
- Orosius. Historiarum adversos paganos libri VII.
- Pliny the Younger. Letters, X.
- Plutarch. Parallel Lives.
- Polybius. Histories (Ἰστορίαι).
- Pseudo-Hyginus. De Munitionibus Castrorum.
- Sallust. Bellum Iugurthinum, LXXXVI.
- Strabo. Geography.
- Suetonius. De vita Caesarum.
- Tacitus. Annales.
- Tacitus. Historiae.
- Tacitus. De vita et moribus Iulii Agricolae.
- Valerius Maximus. Factorum et dictorum memorabilium libri IX.
- Vegetius. Epitoma rei militaris.
- Velleius Paterculus. Historiae Romanae ad M. Vinicium libri duo.
- Zosimus. New History, I-IV.
- J.P. Colbus, E. Abranson (1979). La vita dei legionari ai tempi della guerra di Gallia. Milano.
- Brizzi, Giovanni (2007). Scipione e Annibale. La guerra per salvare Roma. Bari-Roma. ISBN 9788842083320.
- Cascarino, Giuseppe (2008). L'esercito romano. Armamento e organizzazione, Vol. II - Da Augusto ai Severi. Rimini: Il Cerchio.
- Cascarino, Giuseppe; Carlo Sansilvestri (2009). L'esercito romano. Armamento e organizzazione, Vol. III - Dal III secolo alla fine dell'Impero d'Occidente. Rimini: Il Cerchio.
- Coarelli, Filippo (1999). La colonna Traiana. Roma.
- Connolly, Peter (1976). L'esercito romano. Milano: Mondadori.
- Connolly, Peter (1998). Greece and Rome at war. Londra: Greenhill Books.
- Goldsworthy, Adrian (2000). The Fall of Carthage: The Punic Wars 265–146 BC.
- Keppie, L. (1998). The Making of the Roman Army, from Republic to Empire. Londra. ISBN 9780806130149.
- Le Bohec, Yann (1993). L'esercito romano. Le armi imperiali da Augusto alla fine del III secolo. Roma: Carocci.
- Le Bohec, Yann (2008). Armi e guerrieri di Roma antica. Da Diocleziano alla caduta dell'impero. Roma: Carocci.
- Luttwak, E. (1991). La grande strategia dell'Impero romano. Milano.
- Milan, Alessandro (1993). Le forze armate nella storia di Roma Antica. Roma: Jouvence.
- Piganiol, André (1989). Le conquiste dei Romani. Milano.
- Robinson, H. Russel (1975). The Armour of Imperial Rome. Londra: Arms and Armour Press.
- Southern, Pat (2001). The Roman Empire: from Severus to Constantine. Londra & New York.
- Webster, Graham; Elton, Hugh (1998). The Roman Imperial Army of the First and Second Centuries A.D. University of Oklahoma Press. ISBN 9780806130002.
