= Amaradia =

Amaradia may refer to the following rivers in Romania:

- Amaradia (Dolj), a tributary of the Jiu in Dolj County and Gorj County
- Amaradia (Gorj), a tributary of the Jiu in Gorj County
