= Zlast =

- Location within Romania

Location
- Country: Romania
- Counties: Gorj County
- Villages: Budieni, Ungureni, Barza, Botorogi

Physical characteristics
- Mouth: Amaradia
  - coordinates: 44.9824°N 23.2330°E
- Length: 18 km (11 mi)
- Basin size: 100 km^{2} (39 sq mi)

Basin features
- Progression: Amaradia→ Jiu→ Danube→ Black Sea
- Tributaries
  - left: Sașa
  - right: Budieni
- River code: VII.1.26.5

The Zlast is a left tributary of the river Amaradia in Romania. It flows into the Amaradia close to its confluence with the Jiu, near Iași-Gorj. Its length is 18 km (11 mi) and its basin size is 100 km^{2} (39 sq mi).
