= Aristotel Stamatoiu =

Aristotel Stamatoiu (6 October 1929 – 28 March 2016) was a Romanian counterintelligence general and director of the Romanian Intelligence Service between 1984 and 1990.

He was born in Scoarța, Gorj County and attended high school in Târgu Jiu.
