= Khirbet el-Hammam (Narbata) =

Archaeological site in the northern West Bank

- Khirbet el-Hamam, Narbata, Arubboth
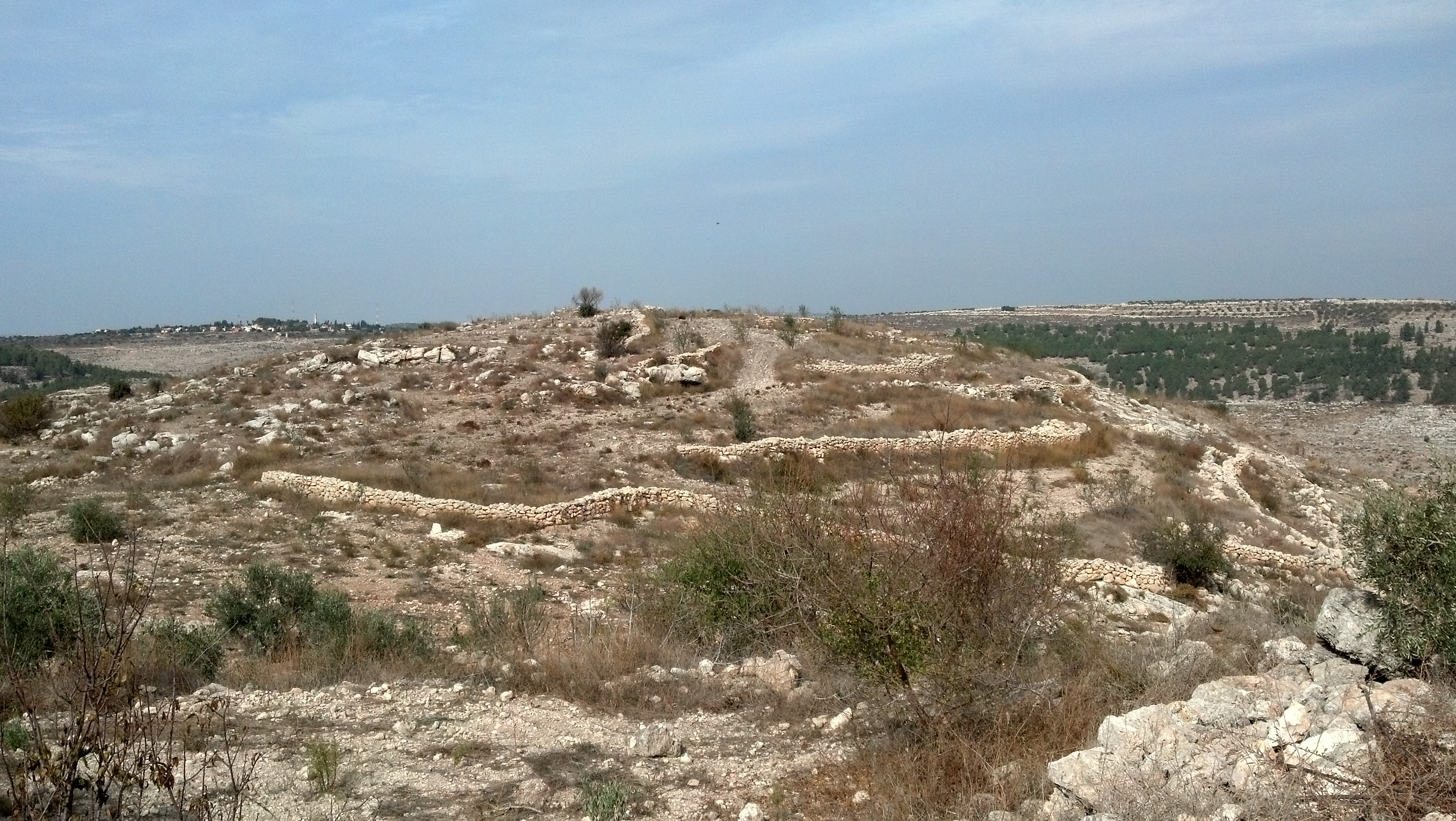
- View from the east

- Location within the West Bank
- 32°24′31″N 35°8′0″E
- Type: Tell, fortified town
- Periods: Iron Age II–Early Roman period
- Cultures: Israelite, Jewish
- Location: West Bank
- Region: Samaria

History
- Founded: c. 11th–10th century BCE
- Destroyed: First Jewish Revolt (c. 66 CE)

Site notes
- Area: 100 dunams (10 ha)
- Archaeologists: Adam Zertal; Yair Elmakayes, David Ben-Shlomo, Amos Frumkin
- Discovered: Late 19th century
- Condition: In ruins

Khirbet el-Hammam (also spelled Khirbet el-Hamam) is an archaeological site in the northwestern Samarian hills, in the modern-day West Bank. The tell preserves the remains of a fortified town occupied from the Iron Age until the early Roman period. Its excavator, archaeologist Adam Zertal, identified the site with two settlements known from ancient texts: the biblical town of Arubboth, named in the Books of Kings as the seat of an administrative district under Solomon, and Narbata, a Jewish town that figures in Josephus's book, The Jewish War.

The town occupied two adjacent hilltops separated by a saddle, at the southern end of a spur above a deep riverbed (wadi). The inhabitants relied on rock-cut reservoirs, including one attributed to the Iron Age, and three quarried in the Hasmonean period and used into the 1st century CE. The site reached its greatest extent in the Second Temple period and was destroyed during the First Jewish Revolt. Surrounding it are the remains of a circumvallation wall, several camps, and an assault ramp, which Zertal connected to the revolt and described as closely paralleling those found at Machaerus.

== Identification ==
Adam Zertal proposed identifying the site, for its earliest phase, with the biblical town of Arubboth, described in 1 Kings (4:10) as the center of the Hepher district, the third of the twelve districts into which Solomon's kingdom was divided.

For the site's Hellenistic and Roman phases, Zertal identified it with Narbata, a Jewish town mentioned twice by Josephus in The Jewish War, where it is located some sixty stadia from Caesarea. Josephus first describes Narbata as the place to which the Jews of Caesarea fled with their Torah scrolls after a conflict with gentiles in the city (2.289–292). Later, during a campaign by Gaius Cestius Gallus to suppress the spreading revolt, Roman cavalry are said to have ravaged the district of Narbata (2.509). Zertal regarded the town as one of the so-called Nirbachta (later Narbata) settlements that, in his reconstruction, were established in Samaria by Jews returning from the Babylonian exile. The identification of el-Hammam with Narbata is not universally accepted; Narbata has also been identified with the archaeological site of Khirbet Beidus (also known as Tel Narbeta), near modern Ma'anit.

== Geography ==
Khirbet el-Hammam is located in the northwestern part of the historical region of Samaria, on the western flank of the Shechem syncline. The site covers about 100 dunams (10 ha) and spreads over two hilltops divided by a saddle, located above the deep riverbed of Wadi Giz (also known as the Hadera Stream). The northern hill, known as "el-Hammam A", holds the town's primary remains, including an upper fortified area; the larger and higher southern hill, "el-Hammam B", is less explored, and seemingly served as the town's agricultural hinterland.

== Research history ==
The site was first documented in the late 19th century, by Claude R. Conder and Herbert H. Kitchener of the PEF Survey of Palestine team. Almost a century later, in the 1970s, the site again attracted scholarly attention when the Manasseh Hill Country Survey team, headed by Adam Zertal, surveyed it; he subsequently followed the survey with four seasons of excavation at el-Hammam A.

The underground water systems, including the previously unrecorded summit reservoir attributed to Iron Age II, were documented in archaeological works prompted by looting at the slope reservoirs. The work was conducted by Yair Elmakayes in collaboration with David Ben-Shlomo and Amos Frumkin, and was published in 2023.

== Archaeology ==
=== Iron Age ===
Pottery shows that the town was founded around the 11th to 10th century BCE and was thereafter occupied continuously, with many sherds of the period of the Kingdom of Israel (9th to 8th centuries BCE) and of the later Iron Age, followed by remains from the Persian period.

A reservoir attributed to the Iron Age II was identified at the northern end of the summit, reached through a depression about 10 meters across and 4 meters deep. A short plastered channel descends from it to a crescent-shaped underground chamber roughly 17 meters long, plastered throughout and with an estimated capacity of around 340 cubic meters. A watchtower beside the depression (near the remains of an ashlar wall) appears to have guarded the system, which lies inside the summit's (possibly Iron Age) fortification, allowing the inhabitants to protect their water and to draw on it through a drought or siege. Its three smoothed plaster layers and its irregular, fracture-following quarrying differ markedly from the slope reservoirs, indicating an earlier date. Rooftop-fed reservoirs of this kind are characteristic of Iron Age II sites such as Tel Be'er Sheva and Tel Arad, and the system's closest parallel, at Khallet es-Sihrij near Rosh HaAyin, is dated to the 8th and 7th centuries BCE.

A group of rock-cut wine storage pits similar to those found in Iron Age II wine cellars at Gibeon was discovered at el-Hammam B.

=== Hellenistic and Roman periods ===
The town expanded in the Hellenistic and Roman periods.

On the northern slope of El-Hammam A, below and outside the summit fortification, three rock-cut and plastered reservoirs hold capacities of 450, 500, and 650 cubic meters respectively. Each was lined with at least two coats of plaster (an inner white coat beneath an outer grey one) extending up to the ceiling, and comparable installations are known at the fortresses of Arumah and Artabba, as well as at Khirbet Kefirah. The reservoirs were fed by runoff channeled from the town and its rooftops, a water-collection method also documented at several Hasmonean desert fortresses such as Hyrcania and Alexandrium. Their typology and two-layer plaster, supported by a radiocarbon date of roughly 200–50 BCE, place their construction in the Hasmonean period, with continued use into the first century CE up to the site's destruction.

=== Siege and destruction during the First Jewish Revolt ===
The site was destroyed during the First Jewish Revolt; Zertal reported burning during the 1st century CE, and the ceramic and numismatic evidence indicates that occupation ceased in the 1st or 2nd century CE.

Evidence for the siege remains to this day, interpreted as a Roman siege of the town in the summer of 66 CE, consists of three elements of a full Roman siege, circumvallation, camps and an assault ramp. When identified, it was the fourth known Roman siege system in the region, following those at Masada, Betar, and Machaerus, the last of which is its closest parallel. The circumvallation surrounds the town on the west, north, and east, with only a short stretch surviving on the gentler southern side; its preserved length is about 1,516 meters. In its best-preserved section, the wall is about 2.2 meters wide and over 2 meters high, built as two rows of large dressed stone; in keeping with Roman practice, it was laid out beyond the defenders' missile range.

Three small camps are associated with the wall. Limited excavation carried out in the western half of Camp B yielded sparse 1st- to 2nd-century CE pottery, including types known from Masada, as well as a coin of Herod Archelaus on a sealed floor. An assault ramp of two parallel walls with an earthen core, about 100 meters long and 48 meters wide, crosses the saddle and widens at its southern end into a triangular platform. The eastern wall is far better built than the western, leading Zertal to suggest it predates the siege, perhaps carrying the town's water conduit before being incorporated by the Roman engineers. Elmakayes, Ben-Shlomo, and Frumkin instead argued that the ramp linked the two hills from the Iron Age, and that the Romans, at most, widened and raised it to move siege engines up to the walls.

A large building of the medieval period later stood on the southern hill, using stones taken from the Roman circumvallation wall.

== See also ==
- Siege warfare in ancient Rome

== Bibliography ==
=== Sources ===
- Elmakayes, Yair; Ben-Shlomo, David; Frumkin, Amos (2023). "A New Look at the Water Systems at Khirbet el-Ḥamam (Narbata)". Israel Exploration Journal. 73 (1): 56–72. JSTOR 27315425.
- Zertal, Adam (1981). "מערכת-המצור הרומית בח'ירבת אל-חמאם (נרבתא) שבשומרון" [The Roman Siege System at Khirbet el-Hammam (Narbata) in Samaria]. Qadmoniot (in Hebrew) (55–56): 112–118. JSTOR 23674924.
- Oren, Eliran (6 October 2024). "Ma'anit (South)". Hadashot Arkheologiyot – Excavations and Surveys in Israel.
