= Roman siege engines =

Adapted from Hellenistic siege technology

Roman siege engines were, for the most part, adapted from Hellenistic siege technology. Relatively small efforts were made to develop the technology; however, the Romans brought an unrelentingly aggressive style to siege warfare that brought them repeated success. Up to the first century BC, the Romans utilized siege weapons only as required and relied for the most part on ladders, towers and rams to assault a fortified town. Ballistae were also employed, but held no permanent place within a legion's roster, until later in the republic, and were used sparingly. Julius Caesar took great interest in the integration of advanced siege engines, organizing their use for optimal battlefield efficiency.

== Army engineering corps ==
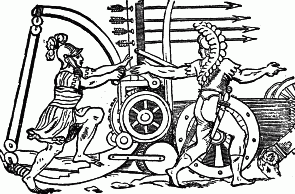
Roman springald

To facilitate this organization and the army's self-sufficiency, an engineering corps was developed. An officer of engineers, or praefectus fabrum, is referenced in armies of the late Republic, but this post is not verifiable in all accounts and may have simply been a military advisor on the personal staff of a commanding officer. There were legion architects (whose rank is yet unknown) who were responsible for the construction of war machines who would also assure that all artillery constructions in the field were level. Ensuring that constructions were level was the job of the libratores, who would also launch missiles and other projectiles (on occasion) during battle. The engineering corps was in charge of massive production, frequently prefabricating artillery and siege equipment to facilitate its transportation.

== Artillery ==
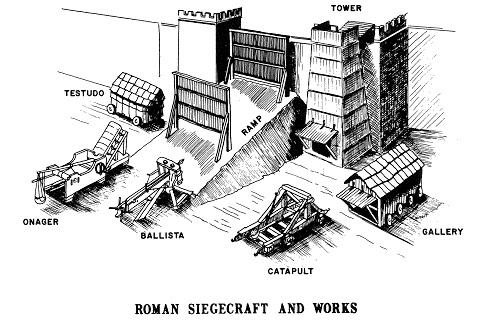
Roman siege engines

Roman artillery was very efficient at the time, and during a siege the Romans would attack the weakest area of their enemy's defenses and attempt to breach the walls at that point. To support this effort, artillery attacks commenced with three main objectives: damage of defenses, casualties among the opposing army, and loss of enemy morale. It would also provide covering fire for troops building siege ramps or those in siege towers. There were machines called tormenta, which would launch (sometimes incendiary) projectiles such as javelins, arrows, rocks, or beams. These devices were on wheeled platforms to follow the line's advance. All were "predicated on a principle of physics: a lever was inserted into a skein of twisted horsehair to increase torsion, and when the arm was released, a considerable amount of energy was thus freed". It was later stated that sinew, instead of twisted hair, provided a better "spring". These weapons were high-maintenance devices and vulnerable to having their leather, sinew, or hemp skeins affected by wet or even damp, which would cause them to slacken and lose tension, rendering the engine useless.

It is somewhat difficult to clearly define and describe Roman artillery, as names are easily confused and historians still do not agree on all definitions. Perhaps best known are the ballista, the onager, and the scorpio.

=== Ballista ===
After the absorption of the ancient Greek city states into the Roman Republic in 146 BC, some advanced Greek technologies began to spread across many areas of Roman influence. This included the hugely advantageous military advances the Greeks had made (most notably by Dionysus of Syracuse), as well as all the scientific, mathematical, political and artistic developments.

The Romans 'inherited' the torsion powered ballistae which had by now spread to several cities around the Mediterranean, all of which became Roman spoils of war in time, including one from Pergamum, which was depicted among a pile of 'trophy' weapons in relief on a balustrade.

The torsion ballista, developed by Alexander, was a far more complicated weapon than its predecessor, and the Romans developed it even further.

Vitruvius, in his De Architectura book X, describes the construction and tuning of ballistae.

Every century (group of 60-100 men) in the Roman army had a ballista by the 1st century AD. It was the command of the chief of the ballistae, under whom were the artillery experts, or doctores ballistarum and finally, the artillerymen, or ballistarii. Ballistae were heavy missile weapons, hurling large rocks great distances to damage rampart walls. They resembled large crossbows, rather than catapults. They were powered by two horizontal like arms, which were inserted into two vertical and tightly wound "skein" springs contained in a rectangular frame structure making up the head or principal part of the weapon. The arms were drawn rearward with a winch lever to further twist the skeins and thus gain the torsion power to cast a projectile. It has been said that the whirring sound of a ballista projected stone struck fear and dread into the hearts of those inside the walls of besieged cities. The stones chosen to be used in the ballista had to be a particular sort. According to Vegetius, river stones were best, since they are round, smooth, and dense. Ballista stones found at the site of Masada were chiseled to make them as round as possible.

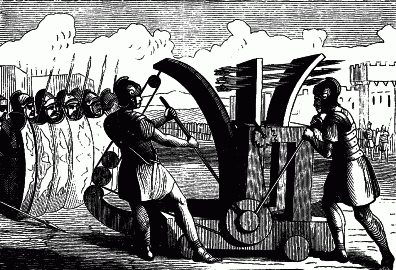
Roman arrow machine

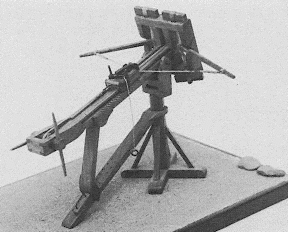
A ballista

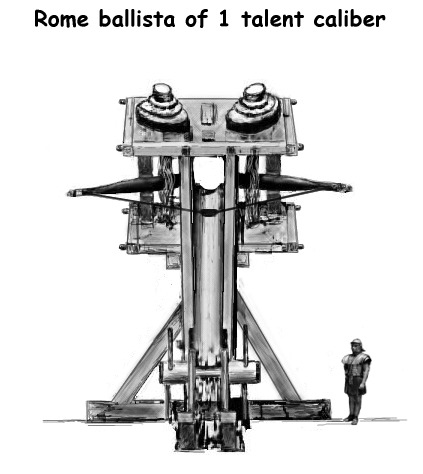
One talent ballista (26 kg weight projectile). The heaviest versions could shoot up to three talents (78 kg), possibly much more.

==== Early Roman ballistae ====
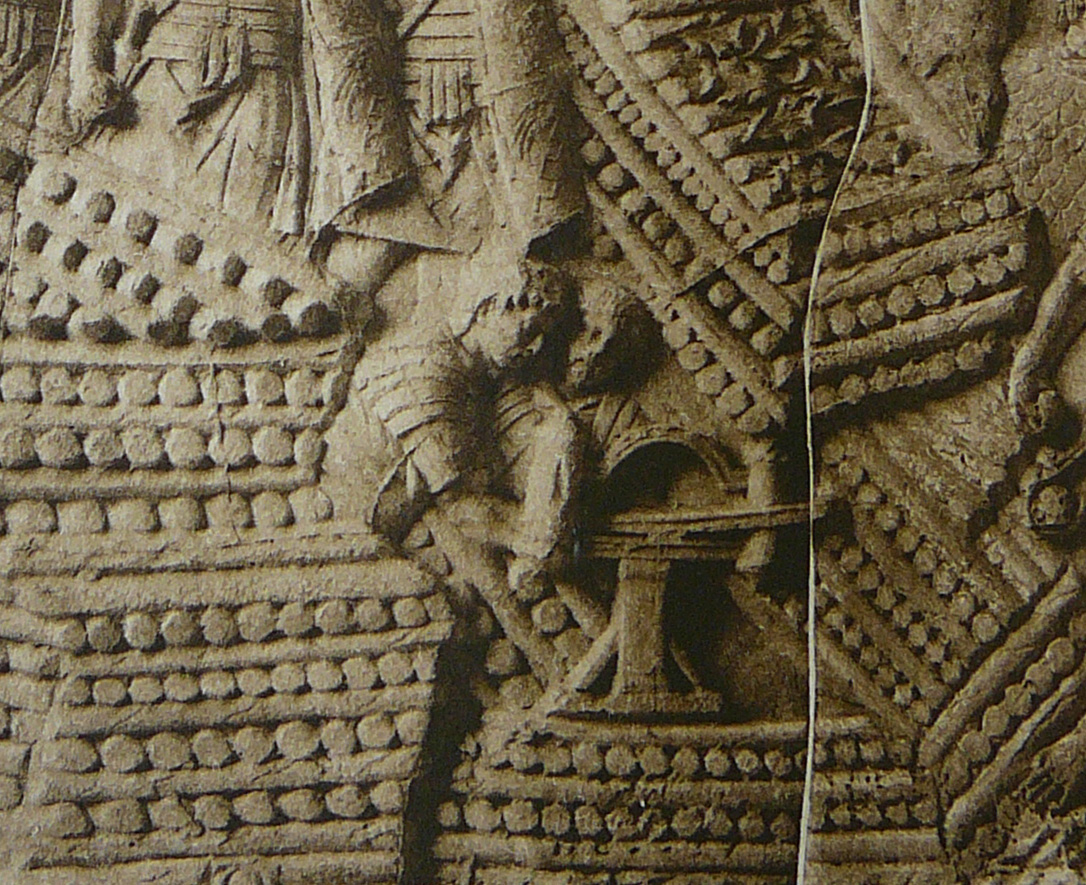
Roman 'catapult-nest' on Trajan's Column

Ballista

The early Roman ballistae were made of wood, and held together with iron plates around the frames and iron nails in the stand. The main stand had a slider on the top, into which were loaded the bolts or stone 'shot'. Attached to this, at the back, was a pair of winches and a claw, used to ratchet the bowstring back to the armed firing position. A slider passed through the field frames of the weapon, in which were located the torsion springs (rope made of animal sinew), which were twisted around the bow arms, which in turn were attached to the bowstring.

Drawing the bowstring back with the winches twisted the already taut springs, storing the energy to fire the projectiles.

The ballista was a highly accurate weapon (there are many accounts right from its early history of single soldiers being picked off by the operators), but some design aspects meant it could compromise its accuracy for range. The lightweight bolts could not gain the high momentum of the stones over the same distance as those thrown by the later onagers, trebuchets, or mangonels; these could be as heavy as 90–135 kg (198–298 lb).

The Romans continued the development of the ballista, and it became a highly prized and valued weapon in the army of the Roman Empire.

It was used, just before the start of the empire, by Julius Caesar during his conquest of Gaul and on both of his expeditions to Britain. Both attempted invasions of Britain and the siege of Alesia are recorded in his own commentarii (journal), The Gallic Wars (De Bello Gallico).

==== First invasion of Britain ====
The first invasion of Britain took place in 55 BC, after a rapid and successful initial conquest of Gaul, in part as an exploratory expedition, and more practically to try to put an end to the re-enforcements sent by the native Britons to fight the Romans in Gaul.

A total of eighty transports, carrying two legions, attempted to land on the British shore, only to be driven back by the many British warriors assembled along the shoreline. The ships had to unload their troops on the beach, as it was the only one suitable for many kilometers, yet the massed ranks of British charioteers and javeliners were making it impossible.

Seeing this, Caesar ordered the warships – which were swifter and easier to handle than the transports, and likely to impress the natives more by their unfamiliar appearance – to be removed a short distance from the others, and then be rowed hard and run ashore on the enemy's right flank, from which position the slings, bows and artillery could be used by men on deck to drive them back. This manoeuvre was highly successful.
Scared by the strange shape of the warships, the motion of the oars, and the unfamiliar machines, the natives halted and then retreated a little. (Caesar, The Conquest of Gaul, p. 99)

==== Siege of Alesia ====
In Gaul, the stronghold of Alesia was under a Roman siege in 52 BC, and surrounded by Roman fortifications. As was standard siege technique at the time, ballistae were placed up in the towers with other soldiers armed with either bows or slings.

=== Onager ===
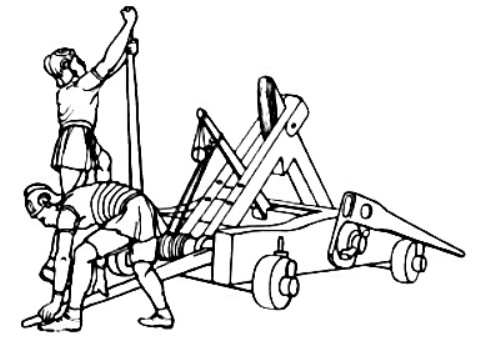
Sketch of an Onager, from Antique technology by Diels

The onager was a post-classical Roman siege engine, which derived its name from the kicking action of the machine, similar to that of an onager (wild ass). It is a type of catapult that uses torsional pressure, generally from twisted rope, to store energy for the shot.

The onager consisted of a frame placed on the ground to whose front end a vertical frame of solid timber was rigidly fixed; through the vertical frame ran an axle, which had a single stout spoke. On the extremity of the spoke was a sling used to launch a projectile.

In action the spoke was forced down, against the tension of twisted ropes or other springs, by a windlass, and then suddenly released. The spoke thus kicked the crosspiece of the vertical frame, and the projectile at its extreme end was shot forward.

The onagers of the Roman Empire were mainly used for besieging forts or settlements. They would often be loaded with large stones or rocks that could be covered with a flammable substance and set alight.

In the Middle Ages (recorded from around 1200 A.D.) a less powerful version of the onager was used that employed a fixed bowl rather than a sling, so that many small projectiles could be thrown, as opposed to a single large one. This engine was sometimes called the mangonel, although the same name may have been used for a variety of siege engines.

=== Scorpio ===
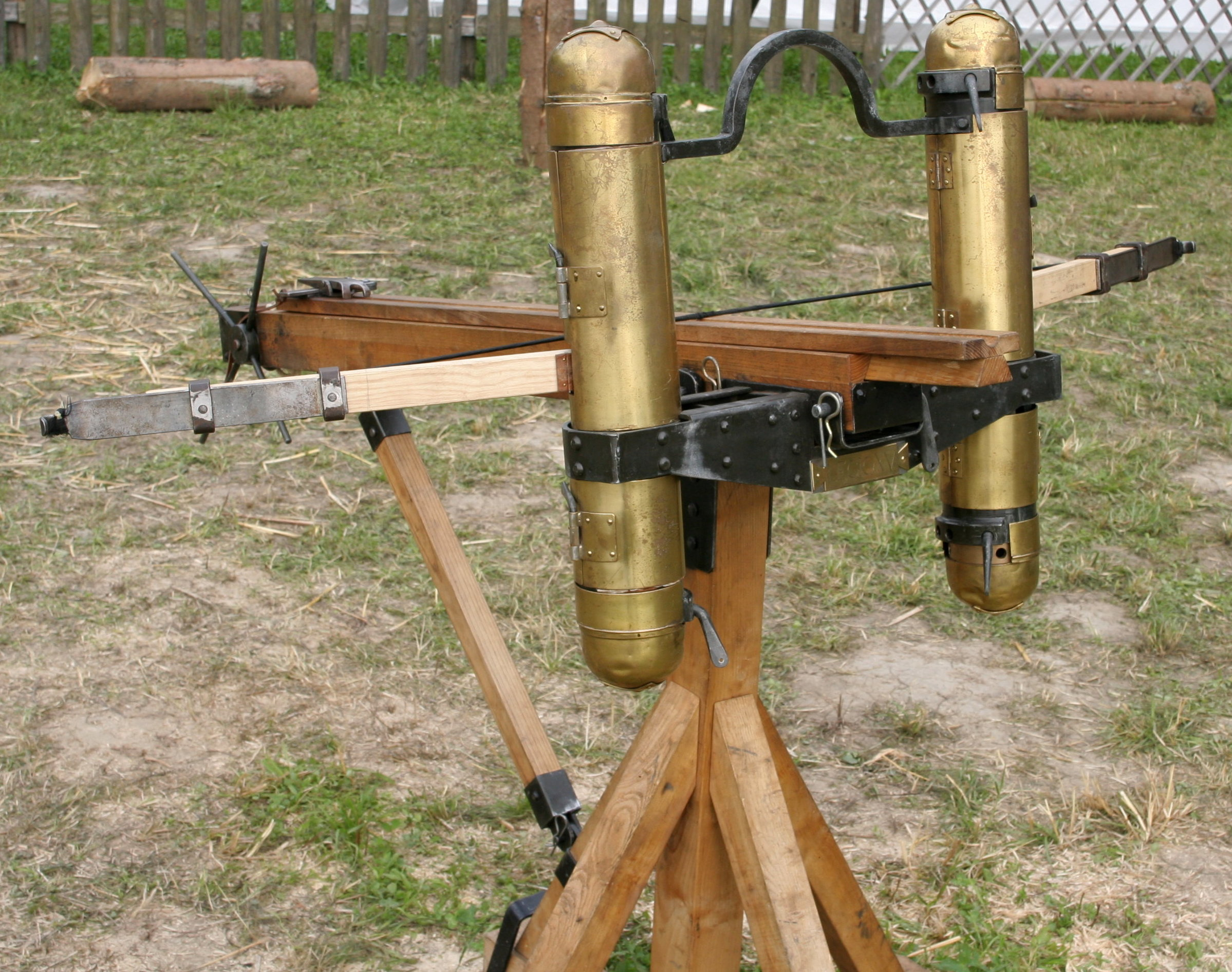
Modern reconstruction of a Scorpio

The scorpio was a crossbow-like device that shot smaller arrows with deadly accuracy used both in the field and in sieges. They were so-named for their deadly, armor-piercing sting and could be operated by just one or two men. Scorpios were meant to kill and injure enemy troops, rather than break down enemy fortifications. Thanks to their smaller size, they could be mounted on or in siege towers. During the Siege of Amida in 359 AD, a scorpio arrow killed the son of Grumbates, king of the Chionitae, when he was approaching the city to surrender.

There has been some research done into the existence of the self-loading, serial repeating scorpio or polybolos. Legionaries on either side would continuously keep turning cranks which turned a chain, which operated the various mechanisms to load and shoot the catapult. All that was needed was for another soldier to keep feeding in more arrows.

== Breaking the walls ==
=== Battering ram ===
Roman battering rams, or aries, were an effective weapon for breaking down an enemy's walls, as well as their morale. Under Roman law, any defenders who failed to surrender before the first ram touched their wall were denied any rights. The moment they heard the ram hit the wall, those inside the city knew that the siege proper had begun and there was no turning back.

Josephus describes the battering ram used at Jotapata during the First Jewish Revolt thus:

It is an immense beam, similar to a ship's mast, with one end covered with iron shaped into a ram's head; hence its name. It is suspended from another beam like a balance arm by cables around its middle, and this in turn is supported at both ends by posts fixed in the ground. It is drawn back by a huge number of men who then push it forward in unison with all their might so that it hits the wall with its iron head. There is no tower strong enough nor any wall thick enough to withstand repeated blows of this kind, and many cannot resist the first shock.

Vitruvius in De Architectura Book X describes the construction and use of battering rams.

For protection, a battering ram was suspended in a mobile shelter called a tortoise, or testudo. According to Vegetius, it was given this name because the ram would swing out of the shelter much like a tortoise's head comes out of its shell. Such shelters would provide the men within protection against missiles and incendiary devices. They were constructed from a framework of strong timbers with planks and wicker hurdles on the sides. The entire shelter would then be covered with a fireproof material such as uncured hides. According to Apollodorus of Damascus, the shelter should be fixed to the ground while the ram was being used to both prevent skidding and strain on the axles from the weight of the moving apparatus. This would also increase the strength of the impact on the walls.

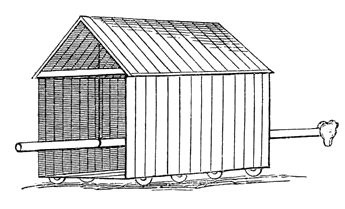
Roman battering ram.

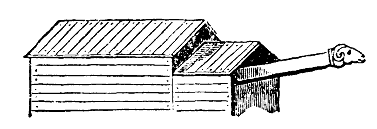
A battering ram (aries) with a shed (testudo). After a relief on Septimius Severus's triumphal arc in Rome.

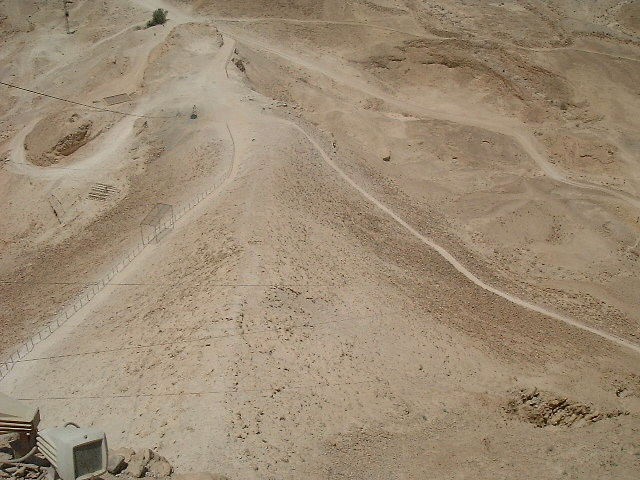
The remains of the Roman siege-ramp at Masada

=== Siege tower ===
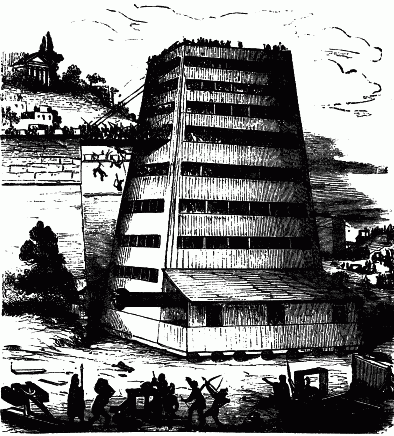
Siege tower

According to Josephus, the Roman siege towers at Jotapata were 50 ft (15 m) high and iron-plated to protect them from fire; those at Masada were reported to be 75 ft (23 m) high. It was possible to have many different devices on siege towers, such as artillery, draw bridges and rams. Those at the top of the tower were to keep defenders off the walls while those below them attempted to breach the wall using ramps. During the siege of Jerusalem in 70 AD the Romans began assault on the third defensive wall within Jerusalem, the tower stood 75 ft (23 m) tall and was compromised when the Jewish resistance tunneled underneath the tower leading it to collapse. Following a basic design, details of tower construction varied from siege to siege and there is no known treatise which specifies at which level siege equipment should be placed. Vegetius noted that, “besiegers sometimes built a tower with another turret inside it that could suddenly be raised by ropes and pulleys to over-top the wall”.

=== Mine ===
Mines could be dug under city walls as a means of entering a city secretly and capturing it but were more frequently constructed to weaken city walls. Once dug, sappers would underpin the walls with wood and cause the walls to collapse by firing the supports with resin, sulfur and other incendiary materials.

=== Corvus ===
In chapter 1.22 "The Victory of Mylae" of his History, Polybius writes:

Now their ships were badly fitted out and not easy to manage, and so someone suggested to them as likely to serve their turn in a fight the construction of what were afterwards called "crows".

Corvus means "crow" or "raven" in Latin and was the name given to a Roman boarding device first documented during the First Punic War against Carthage. Polybius goes on to describe this siege engine as a bridge used to span the distance between two ships in battle. The device was a plank, 4 ft wide and 36 ft long, affixed to the Roman vessel around a pole. This construction allowed the bridge to be swung port to starboard and therefore used on either side of the ship. A pulley at the top of the pole allowed the planks to be raised and lowered on command. At the end of the bridge there was a heavy metal spike that when dropped on the deck of an enemy ship would, with the aid of gravity, become imbedded in the deck. By connecting the two ships in such a way, Roman soldiers could gain access to the deck of the enemy ship and engage in hand-to-hand combat instead of depending on ship-to-ship combat. Polybius also includes an insight on how these siege engines would have practically functioned in battle:

And as soon as the "crows" were fixed in the planks of the decks and grappled the ships together, if the ships were alongside of each other, the men leaped on board anywhere along the side, but if they were prow to prow, they used the "crow" itself for boarding, and advanced over it two abreast. The first two protected their front by holding up before them their shields, while those who came after them secured their sides by placing the rims of their shields upon the top of the railing. Such were the preparations which they made; and having completed them they watched an opportunity of engaging at sea.

Based on this historical description the corvus used some mechanisms seen in the more complex siege towers or the sheds constructed around battering rams. They protected, to an extent, the Roman soldiers as they gained entry to the enemy's space where they could engage in combat.

== See also ==
- Roman engineering – Engineering accomplishments of the ancient Roman civilization
- Roman military personal equipment – Ancient Roman soldier's equipment
- Siege (Roman history)
- Vitruvius – 1st-century BC Roman architect and engineer
