= Scoarța =

- Commune
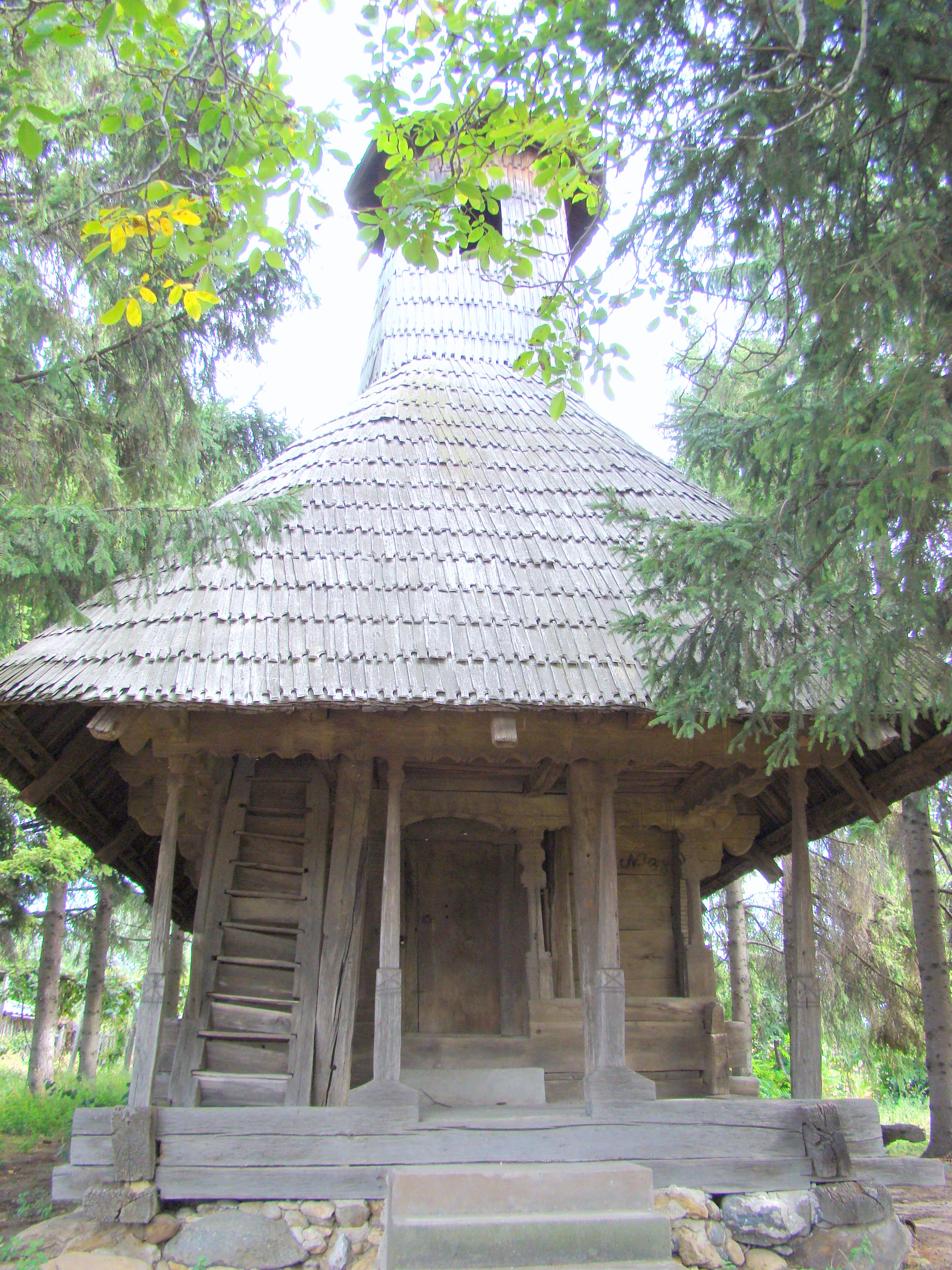
- Wooden church in Pișteștii din Deal

- Location in Romania
- Coordinates: 45°01′N 23°27′E
- Country: Romania
- County: Gorj
- Subdivisions: Bobu, Budieni, Câmpu Mare, Cerătu de Copăcioasa, Colibași, Copăcioasa, Lazuri, Lintea, Mogoșani, Pișteștii din Deal, Scoarța

Government
  - Mayor (2020–2024): Ion-Grigore Stamatoiu (PSD)
- Area: 84.29 km^{2} (32.54 sq mi)
- Elevation: 242 m (794 ft)
- Population (2021-12-01): 5,529
  - Density: 65.59/km^{2} (169.9/sq mi)
- Time zone: UTC+02:00 (EET)
  - Summer (DST): UTC+03:00 (EEST)
- Postal code: 217425
- Area code: +(40) x53
- Vehicle reg.: GJ
- Website: primariascoarta.ro

Scoarța is a commune in Gorj County, Oltenia, Romania. It is composed of eleven villages: Bobu, Budieni, Câmpu Mare, Cerătu de Copăcioasa, Colibași, Copăcioasa, Lazuri, Lintea, Mogoșani, Pișteștii din Deal, and Scoarța.

The commune is located in the central part of Gorj County, 8 km (5 mi) north of the town of Târgu Cărbunești and 17 km (11 mi) east of the county seat, Târgu Jiu. National road DN67 connects it to Târgu Jiu and Drobeta-Turnu Severin to the west and to Râmnicu Vâlcea to the east.

Scoarța lies at an altitude of 242 m (794 ft), on the banks of the rivers Blahnița and Zlast.

== Natives ==
- Aristotel Stamatoiu (1929–2016), counterintelligence general and director of the Romanian Intelligence Service from 1984 to 1990
