= Gruiu (disambiguation) =

Gruiu may refer to several places in Romania:

- Gruiu, a commune in Ilfov County
- Gruiu, a village in Căteasca Commune, Argeș County
- Gruiu, a village in Nucșoara Commune, Argeș County
- Gruiu, a village administered by Budești town, Călărași County
- Gruiu, a village in Făgețelu Commune, Olt County
- Gruiu, a village in Stoenești Commune, Vâlcea County
- Gruiu Lupului, a village in Racoviţa Commune, Vâlcea County

== See also ==
- Grui (disambiguation)
