= Mușetești =

- Commune
- Location in Romania
- Coordinates: 45°09′N 23°28′E
- Country: Romania
- County: Gorj
- Subdivisions: Arșeni, Bârcaciu, Gămani, Grui, Mușetești, Stăncești, Stăncești-Larga
- Area: 91.89 km^{2} (35.48 sq mi)
- Population (2021-12-01): 1,819
  - Density: 19.80/km^{2} (51.27/sq mi)
- Time zone: UTC+02:00 (EET)
  - Summer (DST): UTC+03:00 (EEST)
- Vehicle reg.: GJ

Mușetești is a commune in Gorj County, Oltenia, Romania. It is composed of seven villages: Arșeni, Bârcaciu, Gămani, Grui, Mușetești, Stăncești and Stăncești-Larga.
