= Bălănești, Gorj =

Bălănești
- Commune
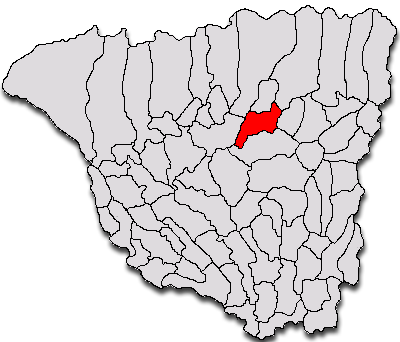
- Location in Gorj County

- Location in Romania
- Coordinates: 45°04′N 23°24′E
- Country: Romania
- County: Gorj
- Subdivisions: Bălănești, Blidari, Cânepești, Glodeni, Ohaba, Voiteștii din Deal, Voiteștii din Vale
- Area: 62.81 km^{2} (24.25 sq mi)
- Population (2021-12-01): 2,209
  - Density: 35/km^{2} (91/sq mi)
- Time zone: EET/EEST (UTC+2/+3)
- Vehicle reg.: GJ

Bălănești is a commune in Gorj County, Oltenia, Romania. It is composed of seven villages: Bălănești, Blidari, Cânepești, Glodeni, Ohaba, Voiteștii din Deal and Voiteștii din Vale.
