= Drăguțești =

- Commune
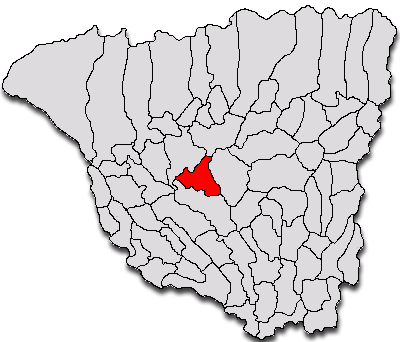
- Location in Gorj County

- Location in Romania
- Coordinates: 44°58′N 23°14′E
- Country: Romania
- County: Gorj
- Subdivisions: Cârbești, Dâmbova, Drăguțești, Iași-Gorj, Tâlvești, Urechești

Government
  - Mayor (2020–2024): Dumitru-Ion Popescu (PSD)
- Area: 59.66 km^{2} (23.03 sq mi)
- Population (2021-12-01): 4,969
  - Density: 83.29/km^{2} (215.7/sq mi)
- Time zone: UTC+02:00 (EET)
  - Summer (DST): UTC+03:00 (EEST)
- Vehicle reg.: GJ
- Website: primaria-dragutesti.ro

Drăguțești is a commune in Gorj County, Oltenia, Romania. It is composed of six villages: Cârbești, Dâmbova, Drăguțești, Iași-Gorj, Tâlvești and Urechești.
