= List of mechanical engineers =

This is a list of mechanical engineers, noted for their contribution to the field of mechanical engineering.

See also List of engineers for links to other engineering professions.

== A ==
- Abramo Colorni (1544–1599) – Italian-Jewish Renaissance engineer, architect, alchemist
- Ahmed Zulfikar (1952–2010) – entrepreneur and businessman
- Al-Jazari (1136–1206) – polymath, numerous mechanical innovations
- Al-Zarqali (1029–1087) – instrument maker, astrologer, and leading astronomers
- Archimedes (c. 287–212 BC) – polymath, inventor of the screw pump
- Richard Arkwright (1733–1792) – credited with inventing the spinning frame but most notable for contributions to the modern factory system
- William George Armstrong, 1st Baron Armstrong (1810–1900) – hydraulic power pioneer, founder of Armstrong Whitworth

== B ==
- Charles Babbage (1791–1871) – creator of the difference engine
- George Herman Babcock (1832–1893) – co-invented an improved safety water tube steam boiler, co-founder of Babcock & Wilcox
- Joseph Cyril Bamford (1916–2001) – founder of the JCB company, manufacturing heavy plant, and especially backhoes
- Eugenio Barsanti (1821–1864) – early developer of internal combustion engine
- Karl Benz (1844–1929) – generally regarded as the inventor of the gasoline-powered automobile, founder of Mercedes-Benz
- Henry Bessemer (1813–1898) – best known as the creator of the Bessemer Process
- John Blenkinsop (1783–1831) – steam locomotive pioneer, developed rack and pinion railway system
- Thomas Bouch (1822–1880) – railway engineer, helped develop the roll-on/roll-off train ferry
- Matthew Boulton (1728–1809) – steam engineer, associate of James Watt
- Joseph Bramah (1748–1814) – hydraulic power pioneer and inventor of the hydraulic press
- Isambard Kingdom Brunel (1805–1859) – design contributions include the Great Western Railway and the SS Great Eastern
- William Brunton (1777–1851) – early steam power pioneer, inventor of the Brunton's Mechanical Traveller
- Oliver Bulleid (1882–1970) – railway engineer
- David Bushnell (1742–1824) – creator of the Turtle, credited as the first military submarine

== C ==
- Gerolamo Cardano (1501–1576) – numerous mechanical inventions including the combination lock, gimbal, Cardan shaft, and Cardan grille
- Nicolas Léonard Sadi Carnot (1796–1832) – physicist and military engineer
- Thomas Carr (engineer) (1824–1874) - inventor of the Carr's disintegrator
- Willis Carrier (1876–1950) – pioneered the design and manufacture of modern air conditioning systems
- Edmund Cartwright (1743–1823) – inventor of the first commercial power loom
- George Cayley (1773–1857) – aerodynamics pioneer and founding member of the British Association for the Advancement of Science
- Colin Chapman (1928–1982) – automotive engineer, founder of Lotus Cars
- André Citroën (1878–1935) – founder of Citroën automotive, known for application of double-helical gears
- Joseph Clement (1779–1844) – best known as the maker of Babbage's difference engine
- Dugald Clerk (1854–1932) – inventor of the two-stroke engine
- Demetrius Comino (1902–1988) – inventor of Dexion slotted angle steel construction system
- Peter Cooper (1791–1883) – designed and built the first American steam locomotive, the Tom Thumb, and founded the Cooper Union for the Advancement of Science and Art
- William R. Cosentini (1911–1954) – founder of Cosentini Associates
- Thomas Russell Crampton (1816–1888) – inventor of the Crampton locomotive and an early advocate of the Channel Tunnel
- Samuel Crompton (1753–1827) – British inventor of the spinning mule in 1779.
- Nicolas-Joseph Cugnot (1725–1804) – early developer of a self-propelled (steam) vehicle

== D ==
- Leonardo da Vinci (1452–1519) – polymath
- Rudolf Diesel (1858–1913) – inventor of the diesel engine
- Bryan Donkin (1768–1855) – associated with paper making and printing machinery, tinned food, beam engines, gas valves and the Babbage difference engine; employed on civil engineering projects such as the Thames Tunnel, Chatham Docks and Caledonian Canal; member of Royal Society of Arts, Institution of Civil Engineers, and the Smeatonian Society of Civil Engineers; founder member of the Royal Astronomical Society
- Cornelius Drebbel (1572–1633) – inventor of the first navigable submarine
- Keith Duckworth (1933–2005) – designer of the Cosworth DFV

== E ==
- Thomas Alva Edison (1847–1931) – inventor, entrepreneur
- Chaim Elata (born 1929) – Israeli professor of mechanical engineering, President of Ben-Gurion University of the Negev, and Chairman of the Israel Public Utility Authority for Electricity
- John Ericsson (1803–1889) – steam engine design, propeller design, iron clad warships (USS Monitor)
- Oliver Evans (1755–1819) – steam power pioneer and inventor, best known for his "Oruktor Amphibolos"

== F ==
- William Fairbairn (1789–1874) – steam power pioneer, developer of early high-pressure boiler (Lancashire boiler)
- Harry Ferguson (1884–1960) – agricultural equipment engineer, founder of Ferguson Company (later Massey Ferguson)
- Giovanni Fontana (c. 1395 – c. 1455) – fifteenth-century Venetian engineer
- Henry Ford (1863–1947) – automotive engineer and industrialist, founder of Ford Motor Company
- Benoît Fourneyron (1802–1867) – pioneered early practical water turbine
- Robert Fulton (1765–1815) – credited with the development of the first commercial steamboat
- Yuan-Cheng Fung (1919–2019) – American bio-engineer, a founding figure of bioengineering, tissue engineering, and the "founder of modern biomechanics"

== G ==
- Emile Gagnan (1900–1979) – co-inventor (with Cousteau) of the diving regulator used in SCUBA equipment
- Henry Laurence Gantt (1861–1919) – inventor of the Gantt chart
- Blasco de Garay (1500–1552) – early steam power pioneer and developer of paddle wheels as a substitute for oars
- Herbert William Garratt (1864–1913) – inventor of the Garratt system of articulated locomotives
- Daniel Gooch (1816–1889) – first chief mechanical engineer of the Great Western Railway
- John Viret Gooch (1812–1900) – locomotive superintendent of the London and South Western Railway
- J.E. Gordon (1913–1998) – engineering author and developer of composite materials
- George B. Grant (1849–1917) – worked on improved calculators and gear industry pioneer
- Nigel Gresley (1876–1941) – steam locomotive engineer, developed Gresley conjugated valve gear
- Ravi Grover (born 1949) – Indian nuclear scientist and mechanical engineer; widely given credit for building India's nuclear bomb
- John Josiah Guest (1785–1852) – manager of the Dowlais Ironworks, Wales
- Goldsworthy Gurney (1793–1875) – inventor and steam power pioneer, known for his Gurney Steam Carriage

== H ==
- Timothy Hackworth (1786–1850) – early steam locomotive designer, associate of William Hedley and George Stephenson
- James Harrison (1816–1893) – pioneer in the field of mechanical refrigeration
- William Hedley (1779–1843) – railway pioneer, built the first practical steam locomotive relying only on the adhesion of wheels to rails
- Beulah Louise Henry (1887–1973) – nicknamed "Lady Edison", patents included a bobbin-free sewing machine and vacuum ice cream freezer
- Hero of Alexandria (c. 10–70 AD) – described many inventions including the aeolipile and the windwheel
- August Horch (1868–1951) – automotive engineer, founder of Audi
- Jonathan Hornblower (1753–1815) – steam power pioneer, developed the first compound steam engine
- Elias Howe (1819–1867) – refined Hunt's ideas, was granted the first U.S. patent for a sewing machine using a lockstitch design

== I ==
- Alec Issigonis (1906–1988) – automotive engineer associated with the development of the Mini

== J ==
- Joseph Marie Jacquard (1752–1834) – invented the Jacquard loom, forerunner of modern digital computers (also see Basile Bouchon)
- György Jendrassik (1898–1954) – developed first working turboprop engine (the Jendrassik Cs-1)

== L ==
- Frederick Lanchester (1868–1946) – polymath with contributions in automotive and aviation engineering, co-founder of Lanchester Motor Company
- Gustaf de Laval (1845–1913) – developer of the De Laval nozzle, contributions in steam and dairy engineering, founder of Alfa Laval
- Gottfried Wilhelm Leibniz (1646–1716) – polymath who invented, among other things, the Leibniz wheel

== M ==
- Ma Jun (fl. 220–265) – 3rd-century China, invented the south-pointing chariot, mechanical puppet theaters, chain pumps, improved silk looms
- Felice Matteucci (1808–1887) – early developer of internal combustion engine
- Henry Maudslay (1771–1831) – considered a founding father of machine tool technology, helped perfect the hydraulic press
- Elijah McCoy (1843–1929) – African Canadian inventor, contributions include automatic lubricator for steam engines
- Eckart Meiburg (born 1959) – German/American researcher, notable contributions to Computational fluid dynamics
- Andrew Meikle (1719–1811) – contributions include threshing machine and windmill sails
- Otto Metzger (1885–1961) – German/British engineer and inventor of impact extrusion of containers
- Thomas Midgley Jr. (1889–1944) – developed tetraethyllead (TEL) and chlorofluorocarbons (CFCs)
- Samuel Morey (1762–1843) – steamship and internal combustion engine pioneer
- James Morgan (1776?–1856) – Applied Materials CEO
- William Murdoch (1754–1839) – associate of Watt, improved steam engine (sun and planet gearing), also developed gas lighting
- Gordon Murray (born 1946) – Formula One, Brabham BT46B, McLaren F1
- Matthew Murray (1765–1826) – steam engine designer, built one of the first commercially viable steam locomotives (Salamanca)
- Mohammad Reza Eslami (born 1945) – Iranian scientist and professor of Mechanical Engineering at Tehran Polytechnic (Amirkabir University of Technology), Tehran, Iran

== N ==
- James Nasmyth (1808–1890) – inventor of the steam hammer and other important machine tools
- Thomas Newcomen (1664–1729) – inventor of the first practical steam engine for pumping water
- James Henry Northrop (1856–1940) – inventor of the shuttle-charging mechanism which led to the fully automatic Northrup Power Loom

== O ==
- Nicolaus Otto (1832–1891) – developer of the first commercially viable four-stroke engine

== P ==
- Denis Papin (1647–1712) – inventor of the steam digester, forerunner of the steam engine
- Charles Algernon Parsons (1854–1931) – steam and power engineer, inventor of compound steam turbine
- Ferdinand Porsche (1875–1951) – automotive engineer, best known for creating the Volkswagen Beetle

== Q ==
- Muhammad Hafeez Qureshi (1930–2007) – weapons scientist, aerodynamicist, rocket engineer and missile technologist

== R ==
- Adele Racheli (1894–?) – Italian mechanical engineer and founder of a patent protection office in Milan in 1925.
- Agostino Ramelli (c. 1531–1600) – inventor of the bookwheel as well as various water-powered inventions (clockwork, treadmill, pump)
- John Ramsbottom (1814–1897) – inventor of the tamper-proof spring safety valve and the displacement lubricator
- William John Macquorn Rankine (1820–1872) – major contributor to thermodynamics, heat engine theory and metal fatigue
- George Rennie (1791–1866) – among other developments, a pioneer in food processing equipment (biscuit, corn, chocolate mills)
- Osbourne Reynolds (1842–1912) – major contributor to the science of fluid dynamics and heat transfer
- Harry Ricardo (1885–1974) – internal combustion engine designer and researcher
- Dan Riccio — former Apple senior vice president of hardware engineering
- Richard Roberts (1789–1864) – developer of high-precision machine tools which helped enable mass production
- Alfred H. Rzeppa (1885–1965) – developer of the constant-velocity joint

== S ==
- Ralph Sarich (born 1938) – invented orbital engine
- Thomas Savery (c. 1650–1715) – early steam engine patent holder, author of A Miner's Friend; or An Engine to Raise Water by Fire
- Per Georg Scheutz (1785–1873) – pioneer in computer technology (Scheutzian calculation engine)
- Dan Shechtman (born 1941) – discovered Icosahedral Phase
- Carl Wilhelm Siemens (1823–1883) – inventor of the regenerative furnace
- Igor Sikorsky (1889–1972) – aviation engineer, inventor of the single-rotor helicopter, founder of Sikorsky Aircraft Company
- Juan C. Simo (1952-1994) - developed mathematical models and numerical methods for solving nonlinear problems in continuum mechanics.
- Isaac Singer (1811–1875) – credited with improvements in lockstitch sewing machine, founder of the Singer Sewing Machine Company
- John Smeaton (1724–1792) – principally a civil engineer, but made numerous improvements to Newcomen's steam engine
- Edward Somerset, 2nd Marquess of Worcester, (c. 1601–1667) – numerous mechanical innovations as described in "Century of Inventions" (1663)
- Rebecca Sparling, P.E. (1910–1996) – professional engineer licensed in mechanical engineering, innovations in high-temperature metallurgy and nondestructive test methods, including simpler liquid dye penetrant inspection technique
- Sir William Stanier (1876–1965) – Chief Mechanical Engineer of the London, Midland and Scottish Railway
- George Stephenson (1781–1848) – known as the "father of railways", founder of the Institution of Mechanical Engineers
- Robert Stephenson (1803–1859) – railway engineer; son of George Stephenson
- Robert Stirling (1790–1878) – inventor of the Stirling engine
- Su Song (1020–1101) China – first to use an escapement mechanism (see Yi Xing below) and chain drive to operate his astronomical clock tower
- Dr. Victor Szebehely (1921–1997) – aerospace engineering and celestial mechanics

== T ==
- Taqi al-Din (1526–1585) – polymath, numerous mechanical innovations
- John Ternus – American mechanical engineer and Apple CEO
- Nikola Tesla (1856–1943) – Serbian electrical and mechanical engineer contributing to the development of AC motors and power delivery
- Reuben Trane — Co-founded Trane Company and designed the first convector radiator
- Torine Torines (1876–1944) – pioneer Swedish sewing machine mechanic engineer
- John Tregoning (1840s–1920s) – American mechanical engineer, who wrote the first books on factory management
- Richard Trevithick (1771–1833) – steam power pioneer, designer of early high-pressure boiler (Cornish boiler) and "Puffing Devil" locomotive

== V ==
- Jacques de Vaucanson (1709–1782) – credited with creating early robots (automata) as well as the automated loom
- Richard Velazquez – automotive designer for Honda R&D Americas, Inc. and Porsche AG
- Sir M Vishweswarayya (1861–1962) – chief designer, flood protection systems, Hyderabad; chief engineer, Krishna Raja Sagara dam, Mandya
- Wernher von Braun (1912–1977) – mechanical engineer, space architect credited with inventing the V-2 rocket for Nazi Germany and the Saturn V for the United States

== W ==
- Felix Wankel (1902–1988) – inventor of the Wankel Rotary Engine
- James Watt (1736–1819) – inventor of the Watt steam engine whose development helped enable the Industrial Revolution
- Samuel T. Wellman (1847–1919) – inventor and industrialist responsible for numerous steel industry innovations
- Eli Whitney (1765–1825) – inventor of the cotton gin
- Joseph Whitworth (1803–1887) – associated with standardizing thread pitch and techniques enabling precision machining
- Martin Wiberg (1826–1905) – computer technology pioneer (logarithmic table machine)
- Walter Gordon Wilson (1874–1957) – inventor of the Wilson preselector gearbox
- Ludwig Wittgenstein (1889–1951) – aerospace engineer turned philosopher
- Nathaniel C. Wyeth (1911–1990) – developed polyethylene terephthalate (PET) beverage container
- Wright brothers Orville (1871–1948) and Wilbur (1867–1912) – Pioneer of Aviation, Invented the First Successful Airplane

== Y ==
- Yi Xing (683–727) China – first to use an escapement mechanism in operating a water-powered armillary sphere

== Z ==
- Zhang Heng (78–139) – 1st century-2nd century China, inventor of first hydraulic-powered armillary sphere, and first seismometer
