= Mina Road Park =

Park in Bristol, England

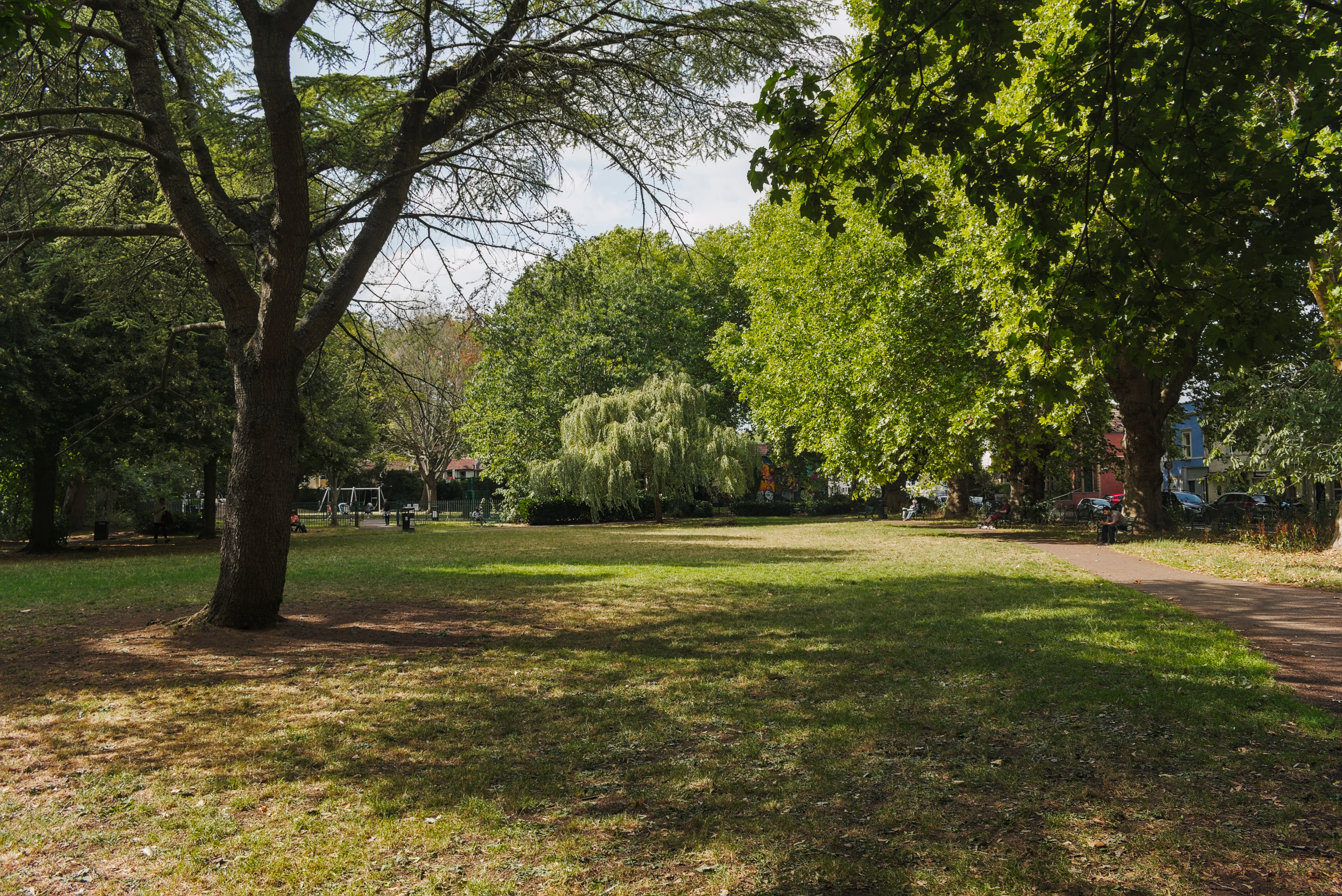
- Interactive map of Mina Road Park
- Type: Urban park
- Location: St Werburghs, Bristol, England
- Coordinates: 51.4683°N 2.5754°W
- Opened: 30 June 1886
- Designer: Frederick Ashmead
- Operator: Bristol City Council
- Status: Open all year
- Facilities: Playground, multi-use games area

Mina Road Park, formerly Hunt's Pleasure Ground, is a public park in the St Werburghs district of Bristol, England. It was laid out in the late 19th century on land donated to the city by local benefactor William Hunt, and opened in 1886 as part of the expansion of Bristol's municipal recreation grounds. The park occupies low-lying ground beside the Horfield Brook (a tributary of the River Frome), with planting and paths arranged to create a sheltered riverside open space; the original Victorian layout also included an ornamental lake, later removed. It is the site of a Grade II listed Victorian cast-iron urinal.

== History ==
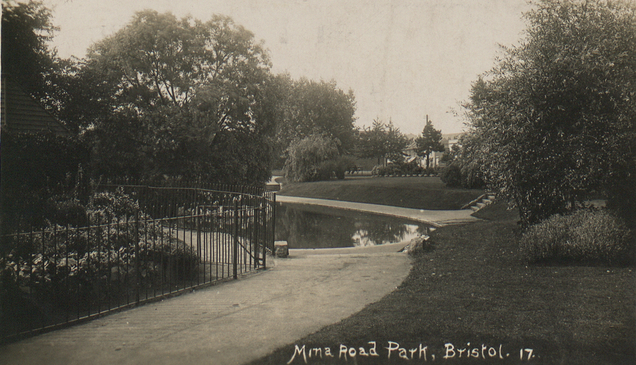
A c. 1920 photographic postcard by Fred Viner showing the lake that was once present in the park

=== Victorian era ===
The origins of the park lie in a philanthropic yet prescriptive gift to the Bristol Corporation in 1884 by William Hunt, a partner in the law firm Hunt, Hodson, Bobbett and Castle. Hunt donated the core land with the specific condition that it be laid out in the style of Cotham Gardens. When the Bristol Sanitary Committee sought to relax this stipulation to curtail maintenance costs, Hunt refused, arguing that a high-quality horticultural layout would "elevate the taste of those living in the neighbourhood" and forestall "invidious remarks" regarding the disparity of civic investment across the city.

The site's low-lying topography and susceptibility to flooding initially provoked skepticism among councillors; during negotiations in September 1884, alternative proposals included a public swimming bath or, more cynically, a "duck pond," with one councillor facetiously remarking that the ground was "particularly suited for web-footed animals". Hunt, however, insisted the ground be treated in a "sequestered manner" with gravel paths and grass, distinct from the asphalted play yards common in other districts.

Designed by Borough Engineer Frederick Ashmead, the park, originally known as Hunt's Pleasure Ground, was officially opened by the Mayor of Bristol on 30 June 1886, concurrent with St Matthias Park. The execution of Ashmead's design was undertaken by Parker and Son of St Michael's Hill Nursery, utilising specialist sub-contractors for the boundary ironwork, masonry, and asphalt paving. The planting scheme was ambitious, featuring ornamental specimen trees including Sequoiadendron giganteum (Wellingtonia), Cedrus deodara, and Cryptomeria elegans, while the boundary walls were lined with colchicum laurels.

A central feature of the Victorian layout was the ornamental lake, requiring the excavation of 2,000 cubic yards of earth. This spoil was utilised to raise the general ground level by 12 to 18 inches to mitigate risks from the adjacent Cutler's Mills Brook (Horfield Brook). The lake included an island formed of rock from Cheddar and was stocked with carp, perch, and roach, though the fish stocks were reportedly depleted by otters. By 1895, capital expenditure had reached £2,692, significantly exceeding the original loan of £1,480, a cost driven partly by the demolition of three houses to improve the frontage.

Despite the raised ground levels, the area's hydrology remained problematic. In 1888, the Boiling Wells stream blew a manhole cover and flooded adjacent land. Safety concerns were also raised regarding the unfenced water, following a near-drowning in 1888. Severe flooding occurred in November 1894 and again in early 1901, when the brook overflowed, submerging Mina Road under three feet of water and presenting the "appearance of a rushing river".

=== Early 20th century ===
The park's amenities were expanded in 1887 with the installation of a bandstand, and further in December 1890 with the acquisition of a vacant parcel of land intended for the cancelled road development of Boswell Street. By the 1890s, the grounds were in use as a rehearsal space for youth carol singing groups. During the First World War, the park hosted religious gatherings, notably a large intercession service in July 1915 accompanied by the Bristol Temperance Prize Band.

The exigencies of the Second World War brought significant detriment to the Victorian layout and fittings of the park. The ornamental iron railings were removed for the war effort, and the lake was reportedly damaged during the Bristol Blitz. In January 1939, the Air-Raid Precautions Committee approved the construction of trench shelters; unlike in other city parks, instructions specified these be completed at "standard levels" rather than flush with the ground, creating distinct mounds. New playground equipment was installed in 1944, though the war years saw a continued increase in vandalism to the shelters, seating, and horticultural features.

=== Post-war ===
In the immediate post-war period, the park's aquatic features were maintained by a dedicated ranger, supporting a breeding population of mallards in the late 1950s. However, the surviving air-raid shelters were viewed by the City Engineer as impediments, and in June 1961, the Planning Committee approved the filling of the derelict lake to facilitate a new playground.

By the 1970s, the park became a focus of local anxiety regarding safety. In 1976, residents described the surrounding area as an "island of fear" after dark, with reports of elderly residents avoiding the park entirely. The following year, an eight-year-old resident successfully petitioned the council to remove a shelter that had become a locus for anti-social behaviour.

The latter 20th century saw the park re-established as a cultural hub. During the 1970s and 1980s, the St Pauls Carnival procession frequently concluded at Mina Road, serving as a venue for "fiestas" featuring West Indian steel bands, Asian food stalls, and reggae groups. In 1982, the Ekome dance company utilised the park for a free community festival. The park's physical footprint was enlarged in July 1982 following a land exchange with the Brooks Service Group, which transferred a parcel of former industrial land to the public estate.

Infrastructure challenges persisted thereafter, as safety resurfacing was deferred in 1989 due to budget constraints, and in 1994, a historic willow tree, described locally as a landmark, was destroyed by high winds. In 2011, residents successfully opposed council proposals to alter the park's entrance during a consultation on green space disposal. Recent regeneration has included new pedestrian links connecting the park to the Brooks Dye Works housing development.

== Ecology ==
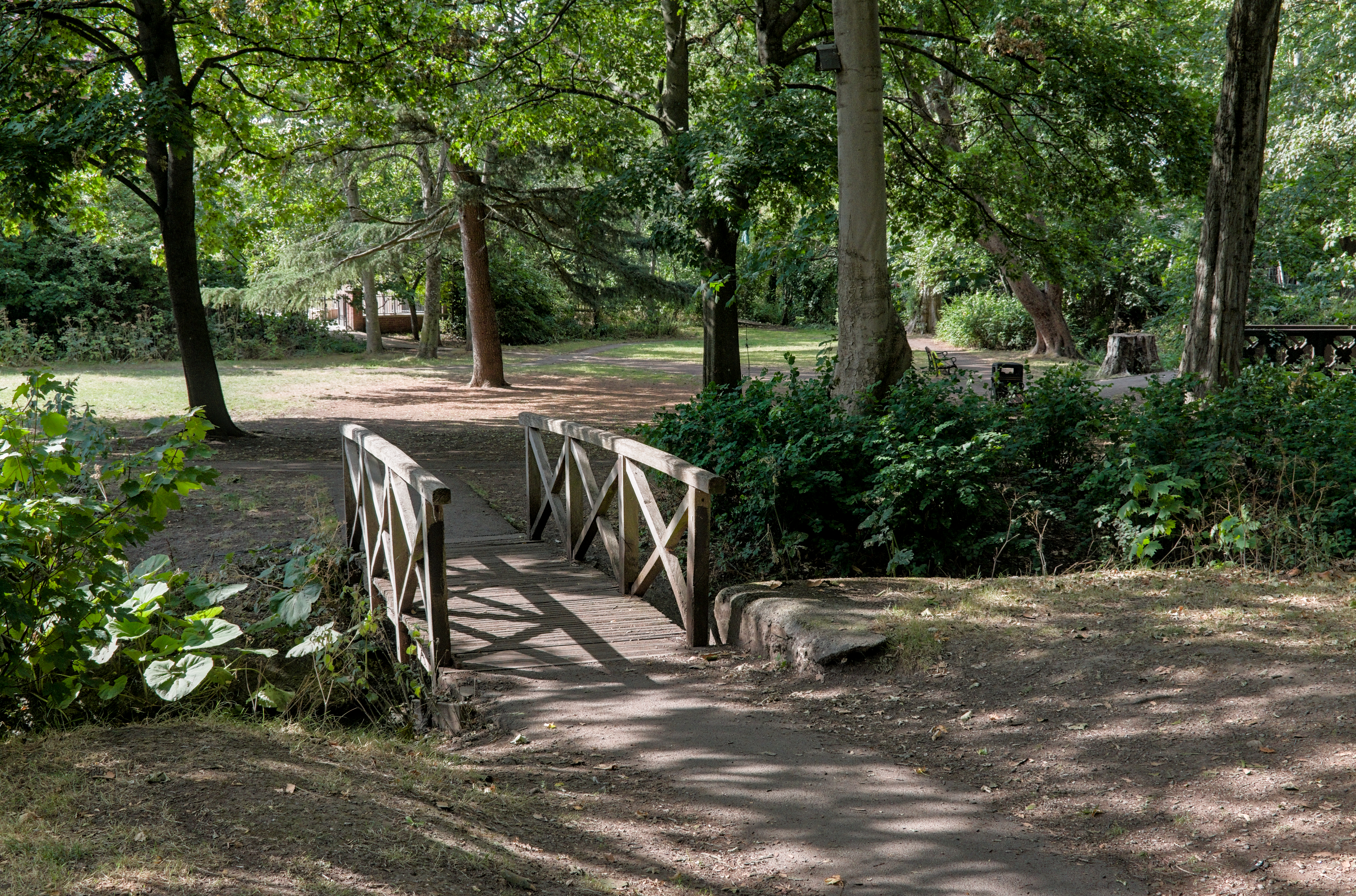
One of the timber bridges spanning the densely vegetated banks of the Horfield Brook

The park's planting scheme was originally designed to provide "pleasing relief", utilising species such as Deodar Cedar, Atlantic Blue Cedar, Wellingtonia, and Japanese red cedar. The present-day tree stock includes an older grouping of London planes, alongside acacia and Norway maples. Residents that these mature trees offer a respite during summer weather and heatwaves due to the shade they cast on the park. Residents have also reported the presence of sticklebacks and kingfishers in the ecosystem.

The Horfield Brook (historically Cutler's Mills Brook or Boiling Wells Stream) runs through the park. While historically utilised for ornamental weirs and supplying the lake, the watercourse has suffered from intermittent pollution issues in the 21st century. In 2007, the Horfield Brook underwent a restoration project led by the Mina Road Park Group, which received a Civic Society award for the work. The project transformed the watercourse, previously described as a "weed-infested ditch", by installing a small weir and a rill composed of rocks and bricks to create eddies and improve flow. A new footbridge was also constructed during this phase. In November 2019 and January 2020, the stream reportedly turned white. The Environment Agency investigated these incidents but could not determine the source due to the culverted nature of the stream upstream.

== Community ==
Mina Road Park serves as a central hub for the St Werburghs community. It hosts the annual Picnic in the Park, a community-led festival organised by the St Werburghs Community Centre, which features music, stalls, and activities.

The park has historically played a role in the St Pauls Carnival. In the 1970s and 1980s, when the festival was in its infancy, the carnival procession often concluded at the park, which then hosted steel bands and reggae performances.

The area surrounding the park is known for street art. In 2022, a mural dedicated to the late rapper SirPlus (Martin Walker), located near the park, was accidentally painted over, leading to a community fundraising campaign to reinstate the artwork at a permanent location off Mina Road Park. The restoration was executed by artists Jody Thomas and Turroe, with a community event featuring performances by local artists held to mark the unveiling.

The park has also served as a filming location, notably for the Channel 4 comedy series The Mimic.

== Facilities ==
=== Playground ===
Located in the northern corner of the park, on the site of the former ornamental lake filled in during the 1960s, is a children's playground and Multi-Use Games Area (MUGA). The current facility is the result of a comprehensive renovation project completed in December 2023, following a five-year fundraising and planning campaign led by the local community group, Friends of Mina Road Park Playground. The refurbishment replaced ageing equipment, some of which was 40 years old, including a popular helicopter climbing frame. The new design, developed by The Landmark Practice following public consultation, features a custom-built aeroplane climbing frame intended as a successor to the previous helicopter. Other installations include a "painted road circuit" for children, a slide setup upon an embankment, a rope swing, and traditional chain swings.

The project was financed through a combination of the Community Infrastructure Levy (CIL) and funding from the waste management company Enovert, which specifically supported the construction of the MUGA. The sports area is equipped with basketball hoops and football goals. The renovated playground was officially opened on 9 December 2023 at a ceremony featuring a performance by the Bristol-based street band, The Ambling Band.

=== Urinal ===
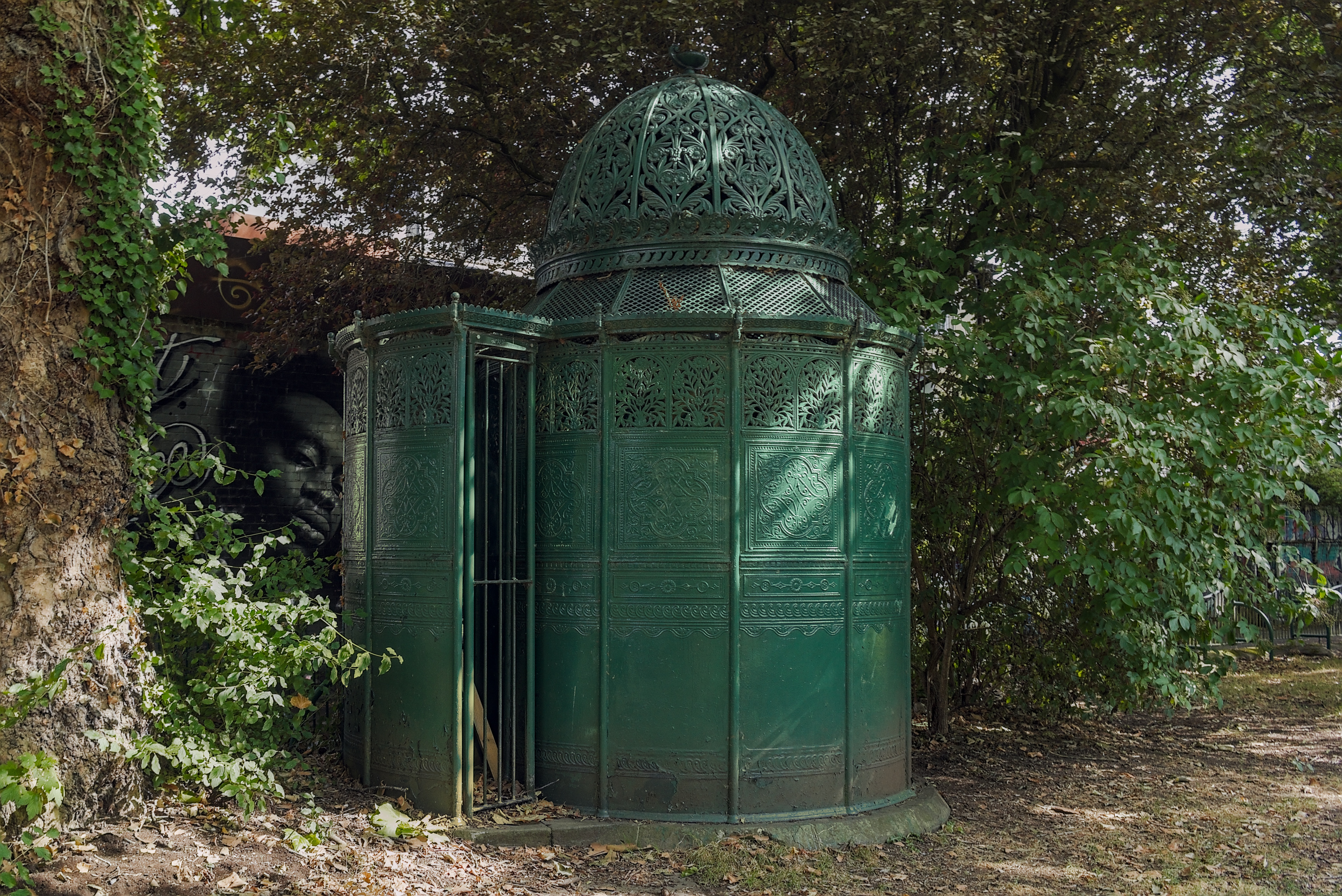
The 19th-century urinal, now closed for public use, located in the southeast corner of the park

A prominent architectural feature of Mina Road Park is the late-19th century cast-iron urinal located in the eastern corner. Manufactured by George Smith & Co. at the Sun Foundry in Glasgow, the structure has been Grade II listed since 4 March 1977. Architecturally, it was described by Andor Gomme as an "outstanding" example of its type, and as featuring a "domed cast-iron [structure] with much filigree". The circular structure possesses curved entrance screens composed of decorative cast-iron panels, pierced at the top, supporting a raking roof surmounted by a Moorish-style filigree dome and a small bowl finial.

It is one of three surviving examples of this design in Bristol, the others being located on Horfield Common and Blackboy Hill. In 1962, the urinal was threatened with removal but was saved following public outcry, with the city's Transport and Cleansing Officer pledging its preservation as a "gem of its period." Despite this, the structure has faced operational issues in the 21st century. Following reports of anti-social behaviour, the council installed gates on the structure, a measure cited in 2018 as a precedent for managing similar heritage urinals on Blackboy Hill.

=== Other features ===
The park retains elements of its 19th-century layout, including shrubberies and flower beds. Two modern ornamental timber footbridges span the brook. The base of a former keeper's kiosk is also extant.

== See also ==
- Parks of Bristol
