= Lalita Udpa =

Indian-American electrical engineer

- Education: University of Pune; Colorado State University
- Scientific career
- Fields: Electrical engineer
- Institutions: Michigan State University

Lalita Udpa is University Distinguished Professor of Electrical and Computer Engineering at Michigan State University. She was educated in India and the US, and focuses her research on nondestructive testing, including the inspection of aircraft and pipelines.

== Education ==
Udpa studied physics at the University of Pune in India, earning a bachelor's degree in 1972 and a master's degree in 1974. She came to Colorado State University in the US for continued study in electrical engineering, earned a second master's degree in 1981, and completed her Ph.D. in 1986.

== Recognition ==
Udpa was named as a Fellow of the American Society for Nondestructive Testing in 2007, and was the 2015 recipient of the society's Advancement of Women in NDT Recognition Award. She was named an IEEE Fellow in 2008, "for contributions to development of forward and inverse electromagnetic nondestructive evaluation methodologies".
