= Rebecca Sparling =

American materials engineer (1910–1996)

Rebecca Sparling P.E.
- Born: Rebecca Hall; June 7, 1910; Memphis, Tennessee, U.S.
- Died: 1996; Laguna Hills, California, U.S.
- Education: Hollins College (started BA); Vanderbilt University (BA Cum laude, MS)
- Occupation: Materials engineer
- Known for: Non-destructive test methods, high-temperature metallurgy, specialty material selection
- Spouses: Edwin K. Smith (m. 1935; div. 1947) Joseph E. Sparling (m. 1948)
- Children: 1
- Engineering career
- Discipline: Materials, metallurgical, and mechanical engineering
- Employer: Lakeside Malleable Casting Co. Self-employed consultant Northrop Grumman General Dynamics
- Projects: Cast Wing project for the U.S. Air Force
- Significant design: Developed simple visible, liquid dye penetrant inspection technique that later became the standard for surface inspections
- Significant advance: Advanced non-destructive testing by co-developing ultrasonic immersion technique

Rebecca "Becky" Hall Sparling, P.E. (née Hall; June 7, 1910 – 1996) was an American materials engineer and registered mechanical engineer in the manufacturing, automotive, and aerospace industries from the 1930s to the late 1960s, who had "established a nation-wide reputation as a metallurgist". Often working on classified projects, Sparling advanced the field of metallurgy in severe environments and developed non-destructive engineering test methods, especially in brittle, high-strength, or specialized materials.

Sparling developed a new, non-destructive liquid penetrant method for defect inspection, and she also co-invented a non-destructive ultrasonic immersion technique called “immersed scanning”. She was a key contributor in drafting the early industry standards for non-destructive test methods that paved the way for evaluating engineering functionality without destroying the part. Non-destructive test methods became ubiquitous as an important time and money-saver for expensive prototypes.

Sparling also wrote 14 of the 16 chapters of the 1943–1944 revised edition of the American Malleable Iron handbook for the Malleable Founders' Society. It became a reference book for those working on iron castings. During her career, Sparling – a licensed mechanical engineer in California – worked at foundries, consulted for automotive companies, and was a materials engineer and staff consultant for Northrop Grumman and General Dynamics, respectively. She retired from General Dynamics.

The Society of Women Engineers recognized her specialty in high-temperature metallurgy when awarding her their highest honor, the Engineering Achievement Award, in 1957.

== Early life and education ==
Sparling was born in Memphis, Tennessee, the youngest of ten children. Her parents were Kate (Wallace) Sampson Hall and Robert Meredith Hall. Both her parents graduated from college. Her father earned a law degree and was a businessman. She spent her formative years at "Pinewood", the family country home in Hickman County. Later, she also lived in Nashville, Tennessee.

Sparling attended Hollins College in Virginia before transferring to Vanderbilt University. There, she received her B.A. cum laude in Physical Chemistry in 1930 and her M.S. in Physical Chemistry in 1931. When she spoke about her career during an awards speech in 1957, she thanked Vanderbilt: “...But there's no denying the fact that I have had many breaks. [In school at Vanderbilt], it looked as though I wouldn't be able to carry on, because I didn't have any money, and Vanderbilt very nicely came to my rescue with undergraduate and graduate fellowships so that I was able to go ahead and study the work that I liked.”

Between 1944 and 1975, she also took additional courses on light metal castings at Massachusetts Institute of Technology, beryllium at University of California Los Angeles, corrosion at the U.S. Department of the Army, and additional courses at Cal State San Bernardino.

== Career ==
Beyond her daily work, Sparling participated in abstracting and standardizing the key properties and tests required of various structural materials. These properties could be tuned to optimize the overall performance and reliability of any product made from that material across the aerospace industry. She also was involved in setting the early standards for future established industry references on the visible liquid dye penetrant inspection method that she developed.

Sparling's professional activities included authoring over 30 technical papers, including "Testing in the Guided Missile Industry," for publications like The Iron Age, Western Machinery and Steel World, Non Destructive Testing, American Society for Testing Materials, and more.

She also presented over 100 technical talks at American Institute of Mining and Metallurgical Engineers, American Society for Non-destructive Testing, American Society for Metals (now known as ASM International), Society of Women Engineers, the U.S. Air Force, and Vanderbilt University. At the 1955 American Society for Nondestructive Testing's national meeting, Sparling was the National Meeting Chairman for the Ultrasonic session.

She served as a committee member and attended conferences for multiple engineering trade associations such as American Foundrymen's Society, American Institute of Mining and Metallurgical Engineers, and American Society for Nondestructive Testing. Sparling also attended the 1957 World Metallurgical Congress in Chicago.

=== 1931 – 1944: Metallurgist and Consultant ===
Sparling began her career working in foundries in the South and the Midwest for 10 years. She started at the American Cast Iron Pipe Co. in Birmingham, Alabama, which helped her gain experience working with metal alloys. She then became a metallurgist at Lakeside Malleable Casting Co. in Racine, Wisconsin, developing special alloyed malleable irons and learning the oil and whiting technique used in the automotive and railroad industries.

Sparling later moved to Detroit and began consulting for Cadillac, Ford, McCord Radiator, and more on the commercial performance of special materials in severe environments. Her failure investigations as a consultant demonstrated that the failures were often due to incorrect selection or usage of materials for a specific application, not the intrinsic characteristics of the materials themselves.

As a metallurgist for the Naval Gun Factory in Washington, D.C. for one year, Sparling also tested and troubleshooted anti-aircraft guns and worn barrels.

=== 1944 to 1951: Chief Metallurgist ===
Sparling worked at Northrop's Turbodyne division (today Northrop Grumman), specifically on developing and manufacturing gas turbines. While working there as chief metallurgist and head of the materials and process engineering group, Sparling advised designers on the selection of materials, tested incoming parts, and managed the metallurgical laboratory.

In her role, Sparling recommended materials and certain design specifications. One key accomplishment was establishing the effects of manufacturing variables on high-temperature metals, such as S-816 and N-155. By setting the allowable stress as a dynamic, not static, variable, Sparling could monitor how the material's performance output dynamically changed based on the input variables, such as time, temperature, and load settings.

Sparling (published as Smith at the time) and D.C. Erdman co-authored the first paper on immersed ultrasonic inspection, or “immersed scanning,” that used crystals separated by liquid from the test sample. It was published in 1949 in The Iron Age. This non-destructive test method was first employed on turbine wheels, enabling the wheels to be verified for their functionality without damaging the part. In 1949, Sparling was brought in to the Los Angeles field office as a speaker and trainer to train the Air Materiel Command on ultrasonic inspection, and explain the benefits and techniques of this new method.

Later, as Staff Structures Engineer reporting to the Chief of Structures, Sparling directed the Air Force Cast Wing project. By optimizing the manufacturing process variables to a repeatable process, Sparling and a commercial vendor achieved a structurally robust casting that met critical dimensional specifications. Sparling supervised the design and magnesium casting of an aluminum wing over 16 feet long, ranging from ¼” to ½” thickness and 3 to 4 feet wide. By improving the casting techniques, Sparling and her team created a two-part wing that replaced a previous hundred-part wing. This innovation simplified the design and made it less expensive to manufacture.

=== 1951 to 1968: Design Specialist ===
"One of the main contributors to materials research at Convair [acquired by General Dynamics in 1953] Pomona [site location], Sparling is particularly known for her work in high-temperature metallurgy, gas turbine development and nondestructive testing," stated a 1957 Convair internal newsletter. As a Design Specialist and Staff Consultant on process and reliability, Sparling also became the head of an Army Mission Command project. There, she continued her work in establishing standards by developing military standards for corrosion prevention.

Her work at the Naval Industrial Reserve Ordnance Plant also included selecting and developing materials for use, developing radioactive and other innovative test techniques, and strategic long-term forecasting on materials requirements for missiles and other special ordnance weapons for the United States Navy.

Sparling made an impact on not just her company, but her industry as a whole. For five years, she represented General Dynamics as a member of the materials and structures Research and Testing Committee of the Aerospace Industries Association. Sparling often spoke for the missile industry at technical meetings and before government panels. She also presented on "Metallurgy in the Space Age" at the San Gabriel Valley chapter of the Society for Advancement of Material and Process Engineering in 1963.

When nominating Sparling for the Society of Women Engineers Achievement Award, Sparling's nominator stated that “Sparling…enjoys the well-earned respect and acceptance of engineers, both men and women, throughout the world.”

=== Advocacy ===
==== Consulting ====
From 1968 to 1981, Sparling brought her engineering knowledge to civic activities in energy and the environment. She served on advisory committees to the California Energy Commission, and on the Energy Management Task Force for the Orange County Chamber of Commerce. From 1979 to 1981, Sparling emphasized the interdependence of the world with regards to strategic materials as a group leader in the Foreign Policy Association.

Other Involvement from 1968 to 1974

- 1969: Charter member and air pollution chairman of the Desert Conservation Environmental Association
- 1972: Co-Chairman of the San Bernardino County Scientific Committee
- 1973: Member and engineer on San Bernardino County Air Pollution Appeals Board

==== Engineering education ====
Sparling was well known for her engineering prowess, but equally for her advocacy of science and engineering education for students, and especially women, for more than 30 years. Though she retired in 1968, Sparling continued to consult in the engineering field and offered career guidance to the Los Angeles professional section of the Society for Women Engineers and K-12 students. Sparling actively promoted women judges at the LA County Fair and various science fairs in her local area. Once, when sharing what led her to engineering, Sparling explained, “My curiosity about the world around me caused me to study chemistry and physics, and the application of these sciences to industrial production led me into engineering.”

Among her over 16 speaking engagements or publications in this area, Sparling also arranged for speakers at the 1963 National Conference on Women in Engineering on the University of Southern California (USC) campus. She served on the Advisory Committee for East Los Angeles College in 1962. In 1963–64, Sparling served on the state-wide informal Advisory Committee on Technical Education for the California Dept. of Education. Between 1975 and 1978, she also represented California's 31,000 members of the American Association of University Women before the State Energy Commission.

In 1964, Sparling was invited to share her engineering experiences with students at the first ever International Conference of Women and Scientists in New York, which is still held to this day. The conference chair, Ruth Shafer, told her in a letter: "How lucky we are to have you on the team."

At the conference, Sparling explained her attitude toward work: “Sometimes I've been tired, or frustrated, or discouraged when I could not immediately find the answer to a problem; but I have never been bored, and have never felt that what I was doing was unimportant... Every day brings new inventions, new discoveries in processing and treatment, new opportunities to learn."

== Legacy ==
=== Innovative contributions ===
Sparling pioneered the visible, liquid dye penetrant inspection method for aerospace applications, which became "one of the most commonly used techniques for surface discontinuity inspection," or checking important surfaces for small cracks. A 1950 article written by Sparling (as R.H. Smith) was thought to be the first description of the liquid dye penetrant method – later called Dy-Chek. Dy-Chek was first developed at Northrop by Sparling and her team around 1948 because she was "concerned about cracks forming on turbine blades" of the jet engines she was testing. This development filled "an important need that Northrop recognized." Later, Sparling wrote the chapter on “Liquid-Penetrant Interpretation of Penetrant Indications” in the 1959 Nondestructive Testing Handbook published by the Society for Nondestructive Testing.

Except for two chapters on pattern design and malleable casting design, Sparling wrote the entire manuscript of American Malleable Iron – A Handbook, published by the Malleable Founders' Society, from 1942 to 1944. Sparling wrote 14 chapters on malleable iron, its properties, recommendations to users of malleable iron castings, the manufacture and metallurgy of malleable iron, applications, specifications, and more. The handbook was the first comprehensive revision to the book in 20 years.

=== First Woman ===
In 1949, Sparling became a registered mechanical engineer, making her one of the first women in California to be issued a professional engineer (P.E.) license. Her license number was 8475.

In addition, Sparling became a Fellow of the American Society for Metals at the 1972 Metals Congress for her “effective contributions in moving new developments in materials and processes from research into practice." She was the only woman to receive an honor at the Metals Congress that year.

In 1972, Sparling served as the only woman advisor on the Scientific Committee on Air Pollution in San Bernardino.

== Honors and awards ==
Sparling moved the profession forward by “promoting a better understanding of the role of the metallurgist to both industry and society,” said the American Society for Metals citation when she became Fellow. Sparling was featured numerous times in the Marquis “Who's Who of American Women.”

- 1948 onwards: “Who's Who in the West” Featured as Rebecca Hall Smith, then as Sparling, Marquis
- 1957: Achievement Award, Society of Women Engineers (SWE)
- 1960: Achievement Award, Convair-Pomona Management Club
- 1965: Engineering Merit Award, Los Angeles Engineers' Week, Los Angeles Council of Engineers and Scientists (LACES)
  - Sparling received the award in appreciation of "her outstanding contributions to engineering and her leadership in encouraging women to become engineers.”
- 1972: Fellow, American Society for Metals (now known as ASM International)
- 1975: Fellow, Institute for the Advancement of Engineering
- 1978: Engineering Merit Award, Orange County Engineering Council
- 1978: Outstanding Engineer Award, Institute for the Advancement of Engineering, Los Angeles
- 1978: "World's Who's Who of Women", Featured, Marquis 2nd edition
- 1980: “Who's Who in Engineering” Featured, Nominated by American Society for Metals
- 1984: Fellow, Society of Women Engineers

== Personal life ==
=== Marriage and Family ===
Sparling married Edwin K. Smith in 1935. Her son Douglas was born in 1938. She divorced Smith in 1947 and married Joseph E. Sparling in 1948, changing her surname to Sparling. Due to this, some articles and publications written by her use the surname of either Smith or Sparling.

=== Death ===
Sparling resided with her retired husband, Joe, in Laguna Hills, California until she died in 1996. She was survived by her husband and their son, Douglas K. Smith, PhD who has a doctorate in Computer Science from Purdue University. He was an associate professor of business, from 1971 retiring in 2001, and the Director of the Computer Center at the Indiana State University in Terre Haute, Indiana.

=== Philanthropy ===
SWE received a bequest in the amount of $68,593 from the Rebecca Sparling estate in 1998, two years after she died.

== Memberships ==
- American Society for Non-Destructive Testing, 1947–1983
  - 1954–56, National Technical Committee
  - 1962–66, National Papers Committee
- American Society for Metals, 1936–42; 1946–75
  - Delegate, 2nd World Metallurgical Congress, 1957
  - National Castings Committee, 1958–59
- Society of Automotive Engineers, 1946–68
  - Aero Materials Spec, 1949–50
  - National Aircraft Activity, 1950–52
  - National EMI Committee, 1967
- American Society for Testing Materials
  - Technical Program Committee, 1956
  - ASTM/ASME Aircraft Panel Committee on Effect of Temp. on the Property of Metals, 1949–50
- American Institute of Metallurgical Engineers, 1934–42
  - Secretary, First Detroit Section, 1936–37
- Society of Women Engineers
  - National Scholarship Chairman, 1957–58 and Committee Member 1976
- Association Technique de Fonderie, 1934–37

== See also ==
- E'lise Harmon
- Beatrice Hicks
- Lillian Gilbreth

== Additional reading ==
- Kimberling, Debra (2025). Chapter 9 "Rebecca Sparling". In Craig, Cecilia; Teig, Holly; Kimberling, Debra; Williams, Janet; Tietjen, Jill; Johnson, Vicki (eds.). Women Engineering Legends 1952-1976: Society of Women Engineers Achievement Award Recipients. Springer Cham. ISBN 9783032002235
