= Materials Evaluation =

- Discipline: Materials science
- Language: English

Publication details
- History: 1942–present
- Publisher: American Society for Nondestructive Testing
- Frequency: Monthly

Standard abbreviations
- ISO 4: Mater. Eval.

Indexing
- ISSN: 0025-5327

Links
- Journal homepage

Materials Evaluation is a monthly peer-reviewed scientific journal covering nondestructive testing, evaluation, and inspection published by the American Society for Nondestructive Testing. The journal was established in 1942.
