= St Werburghs =

Area of Bristol, England

Coordinates: 51.470°N 2.576°W

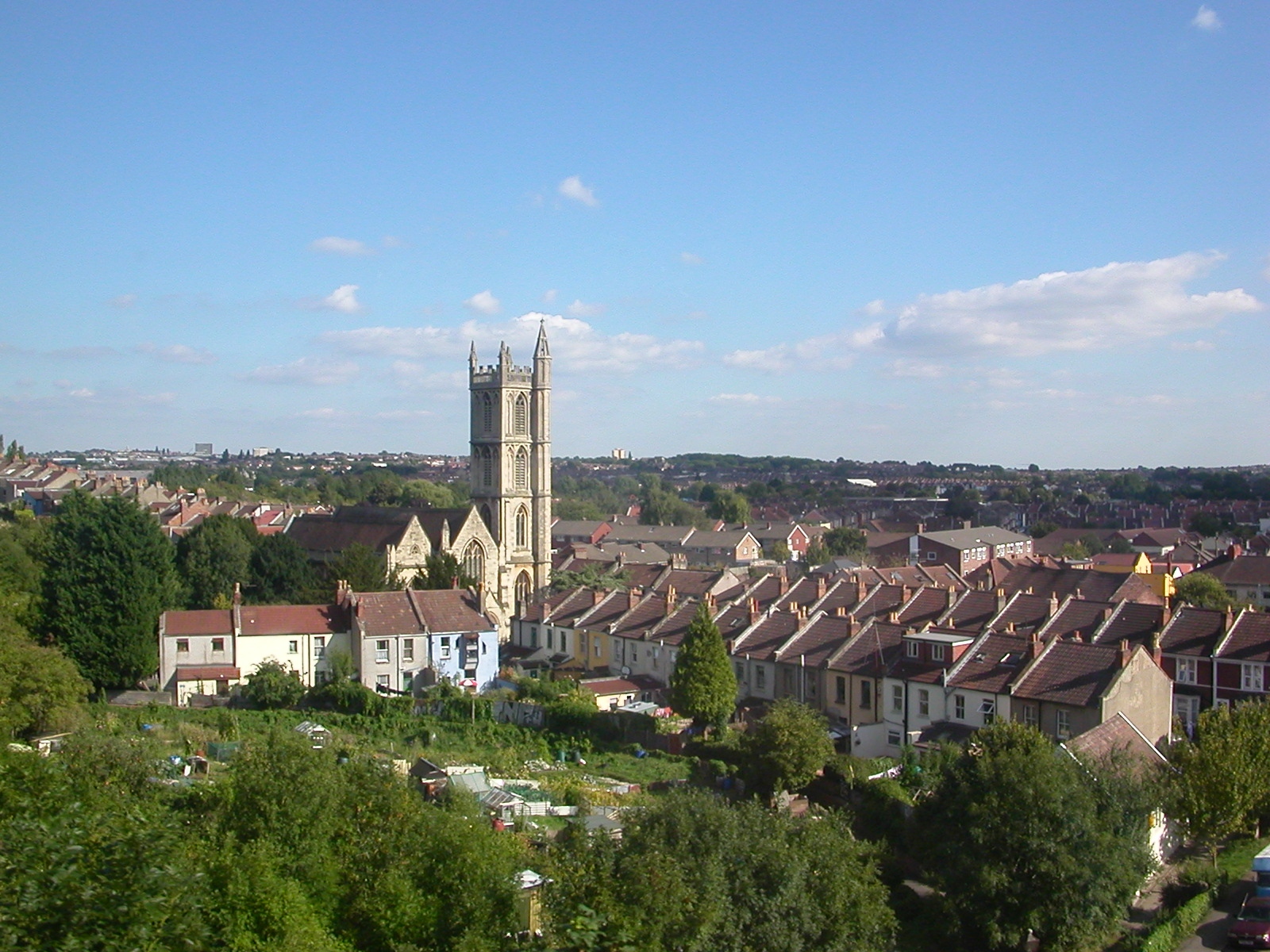
- View of St Werburghs from the Severn Beach Line

- Location within Bristol
- OS grid reference: ST596742
- Unitary authority: Bristol
- Ceremonial county: Bristol
- Region: South West
- Country: England
- Sovereign state: United Kingdom
- Post town: Bristol
- Postcode district: BS2
- Dialling code: 0117
- Police: Avon and Somerset
- Fire: Avon
- Ambulance: South Western
- UK Parliament: Bristol Central

St Werburghs is an inner suburban neighbourhood in Bristol, England. It is in the Ashley electoral ward and Bristol Central parliamentary constituency, 1 1/2 miles (2.4 km) northeast of The Centre.

St Werburghs does not have formal boundaries, but in typical usage encompasses an area roughly bounded by the Filton Bank railway to the northeast, M32 motorway to the southeast, Ashley Hill to the west, and the Ashley Vale escarpment to the north. It borders the neighbourhoods of Eastville to the northeast, Easton to the southeast, St Pauls to the south, Montpelier and St Andrews to the west, and Ashley Down to the northwest.

Whilst it has more of a cultural mix than Bristol, it is not as diverse as other inner city areas. It also has more family housing which has increased house prices. The area has less crime than the other inner city Bristol areas.

Mina Road is St Werburghs' 'high street', whose shops each have an imaginative figurehead protruding from their frontages indicating the type of trade on offer. Mina Road Park, located opposite the shops, contains an original example of a cast iron Victorian public lavatory.

St Werburghs has a city farm and has been the scene of several environmental campaigns including the development of a self-build housing community and the establishing of Narroways Hill as a Millennium Green and wildlife area.

== Geology ==
The solid geology of St Werburghs comprises Triassic Redcliffe Sandstone to the south-east of Glenfrome Road, and Triassic mudstone and halite-stone of the Mercia Mudstone Group to the north. The solid geology in the Mina Road Park area and in the valleys of the River Frome and Horfield Brook is overlain by superficial deposits of Quaternary alluvium.

== History ==
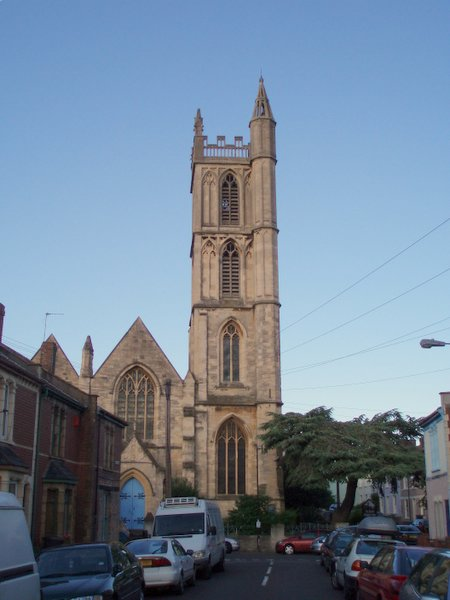
St Werburgh's Church

Before 1879 the northern part of the area now known as St Werburghs was referred to as Ashley Vale, and the southern part Baptist Mills. The area became known as St Werburghs in 1879 when St Werburgh's Church was relocated (with substantial rebuilding) to Mina Road in this district from Corn Street, Bristol. The church is now a climbing centre run by The Climbing Academy.

The area was historically prone to serious flooding from the River Frome, notably in 1882 and 1889. There are still four Victorian flood marker posts. It was also a source of water supply for the city of Bristol through the Quay Pipe and The Boiling Wells.

The BBC Television series Only Fools and Horses, which was filmed in and around Bristol, used the allotments for the episode 'Mother Nature's Son', and BBC wildlife and gardening programmes and Casualty have been filmed in the area.

== Transport ==
Eurocoaches operate buses from The Centre to Fishponds via St Werburghs.

== See also ==
- St Werburgh
