= Hero of Alexandria =

1st-century AD Hellenistic mathematician and engineer

Heron of Alexandria
- Ἥρων
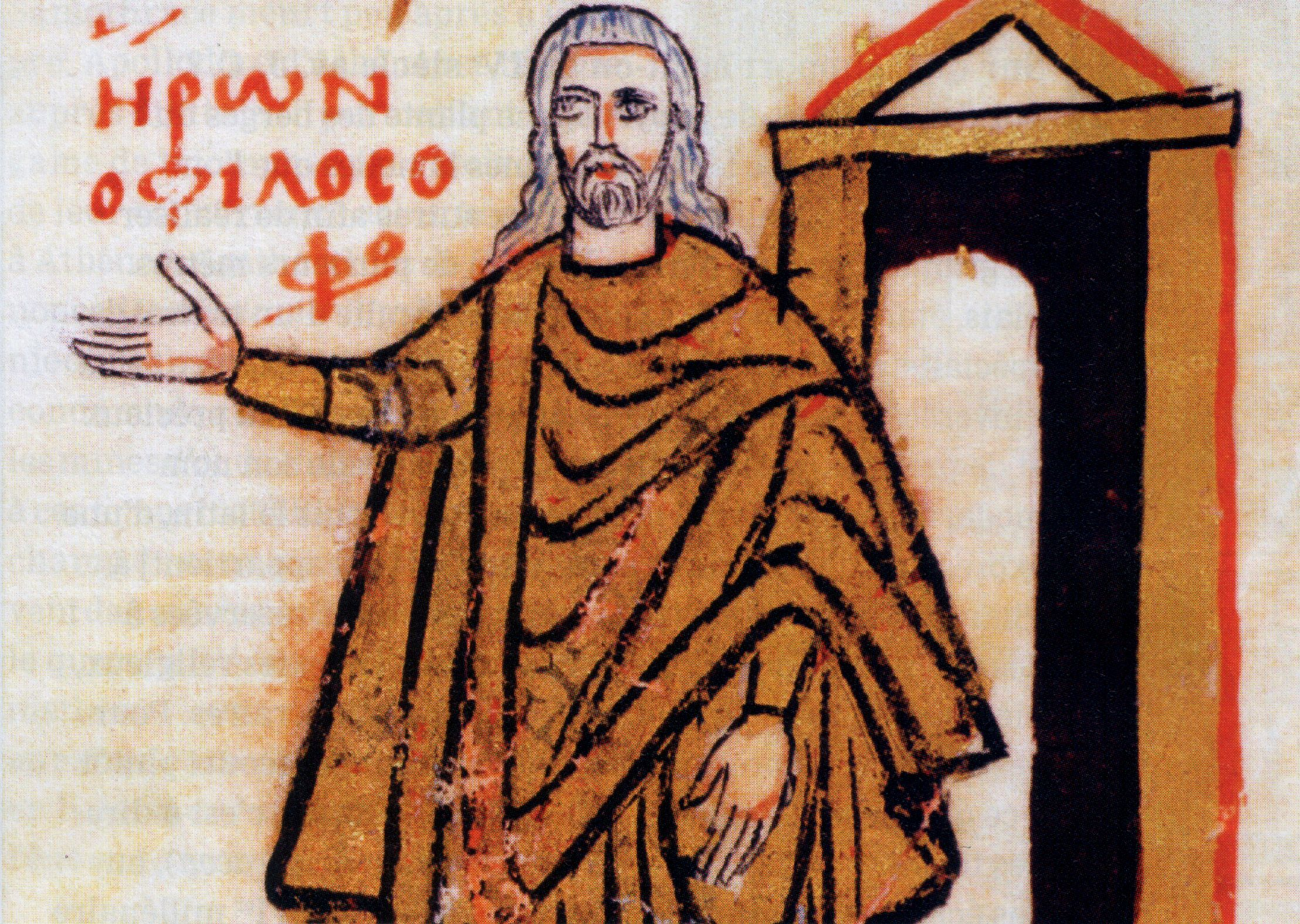
- Depiction in the Codex of Saint Gregory Nazianzus, Greek manuscript, 9th cent.
- Born: Alexandria, then part of Roman Egypt
- Known for: Aeolipile; Heron's fountain; Heron's formula; Heron's method; Vending machine; Hero's principle
- Scientific career
- Fields: Mathematics; Physics; Pneumatic and hydraulic engineering

Hero of Alexandria (/ˈhɪəroʊ/; Ancient Greek: Ἥρων (Note: The genitive in Ancient Greek: Ἥρωνος) ὁ Ἀλεξανδρεύς, Hērōn hò Alexandreús, also known as Heron of Alexandria /ˈhɛrən/; probably 1st or 2nd century AD) was a Greek mathematician and engineer who was active in Alexandria in Egypt during the Roman era. He has been described as the greatest experimentalist of antiquity and a representative of the Hellenistic scientific tradition.

Hero published a well-recognized description of a steam-powered device called an aeolipile, also known as "Hero's engine". Among his most famous inventions was a windwheel, constituting the earliest instance of wind harnessing on land. In his work Mechanics, he described pantographs. Some of his ideas were derived from the works of Ctesibius.

In mathematics, he wrote a commentary on Euclid's Elements and a work on applied geometry known as the Metrica. He is mostly remembered for Heron's formula, a way to calculate the area of a triangle using only the lengths of its sides.

Much of Hero's original writings and designs have been lost, but some of his works were preserved in manuscripts from the Byzantine Empire and, to a lesser extent, in Latin or Arabic translations.

== Life and career ==
Almost nothing is known about Hero's life, including his birthplace and background. The first extant mention of him is references to his works found in Book VIII of Pappus's Collection (4th century AD), and scholarly estimates for Hero's dates range from 150 BC to 250 AD. Otto Neugebauer (1938) noted a lunar eclipse observed in Alexandria and Rome used as a hypothetical example in Hero's Dioptra, and found that it best matched the details of an eclipse in 62 AD; A. G. Drachmann subsequently surmised that Hero personally observed the eclipse from Alexandria. However, Hero does not explicitly say this, his brief mention of the eclipse is vague, and he might instead have used some earlier observer's data or even made up the example.

Alexandria was founded by Alexander the Great in the 4th century BC, and by Hero's time was a cosmopolitan city, part of the Roman Empire. The intellectual community, centered around the Mouseion (which included the Library of Alexandria), spoke and wrote in Greek; however, there was considerable intermarriage between the city's Greek and Egyptian populations. It has been inferred that Hero taught at the Mouseion because some of his writings appear to be lecture notes or textbooks in mathematics, mechanics, physics and pneumatics. Although the field was not formalized until the twentieth century, it is thought that works of Hero, in particular those on his automated devices, represented some of the first formal research into cybernetics.

=== Inventions ===
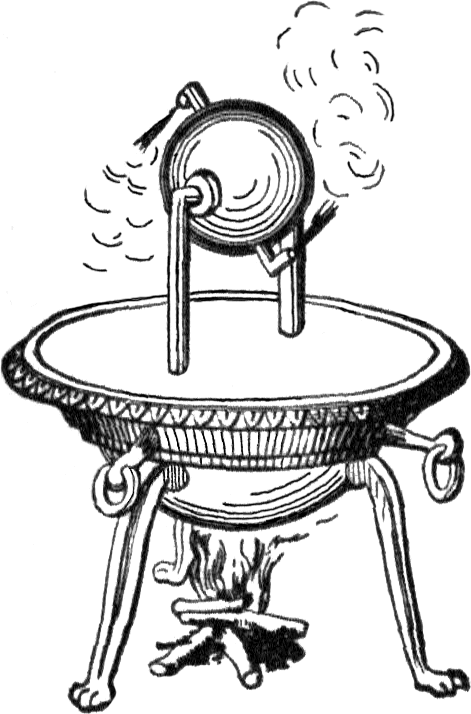
Hero's aeolipile

A number of devices and inventions have been ascribed to Hero, including the following:

- The aeolipile (a version of which is known as "Hero's engine"), which was a rocket-like reaction engine and the first-recorded steam engine (although Vitruvius mentioned the aeolipile in De Architectura, presumably earlier than Hero). Another engine used air from a closed chamber heated by an altar fire to displace water from a sealed vessel; the water was collected and its weight, pulling on a rope, opened temple doors. Some historians have conflated the two inventions to assert that the aeolipile was capable of useful work.
- A vending machine that dispensed a set amount of water for ablutions when a coin was introduced via a slot on the top of the machine. This was included in his list of inventions in his book Mechanics. When the coin was deposited, it fell upon a pan attached to a lever. The lever opened up a valve which let some water flow out. The pan continued to tilt with the weight of the coin until it fell off, at which point a counter-weight would snap the lever back up and turn off the valve.
- A wind-wheel operating an organ, marking the first documented instance of wind powering a machine.
- Many mechanisms for the Greek theatre, including an entirely mechanical play almost ten minutes in length, powered by a system of ropes, knots, and simple machines operated by a rotating cylindrical cogwheel. The sound of thunder was produced by the mechanically-timed dropping of metal balls onto a hidden drum.
- A force pump that was widely used in the Roman world, and one application was in a fire engine.
- A syringe-like device was described by Hero to control the delivery of air or liquids.
- A stand-alone fountain that operates under self-contained hydro-static energy; now called Heron's fountain.
- A cart that was powered by a falling weight and strings wrapped around the drive axle.
- A kind of thermometer has been credited to Hero. Although the thermometer was not a single invention but a development, Hero knew of the principle that certain substances, notably air, expand and contract and described a demonstration in which a closed tube partially filled with air had its end in a container of water. The expansion and contraction of the air caused the position of the water/air interface to move along the tube.
- A self-filling wine bowl, using a float valve.

=== Mathematics ===
Hero described an iterative algorithm for computing square roots, now called Heron's method, in his work Metrica, alongside other algorithms and approximations. Today, however, his name is most closely associated with Heron's formula for the area of a triangle in terms of its side lengths. Hero also reported on a method for calculating cube roots. In solid geometry, the Heronian mean may be used in finding the volume of a frustum of a pyramid or cone.

Hero also described a shortest path algorithm, that is, given two points A and B on one side of a line, find a point C on the straight line that minimizes AC + BC. This led him to formulate the principle of the shortest path of light: If a ray of light propagates from point A to point B within the same medium, the path-length followed is the shortest possible (Hero's principle). In the Middle Ages, Ibn al-Haytham expanded the principle to both reflection and refraction, and the principle was later stated in this form by Pierre de Fermat in 1662; the most modern form is that the optical path is stationary.

== Bibliography ==
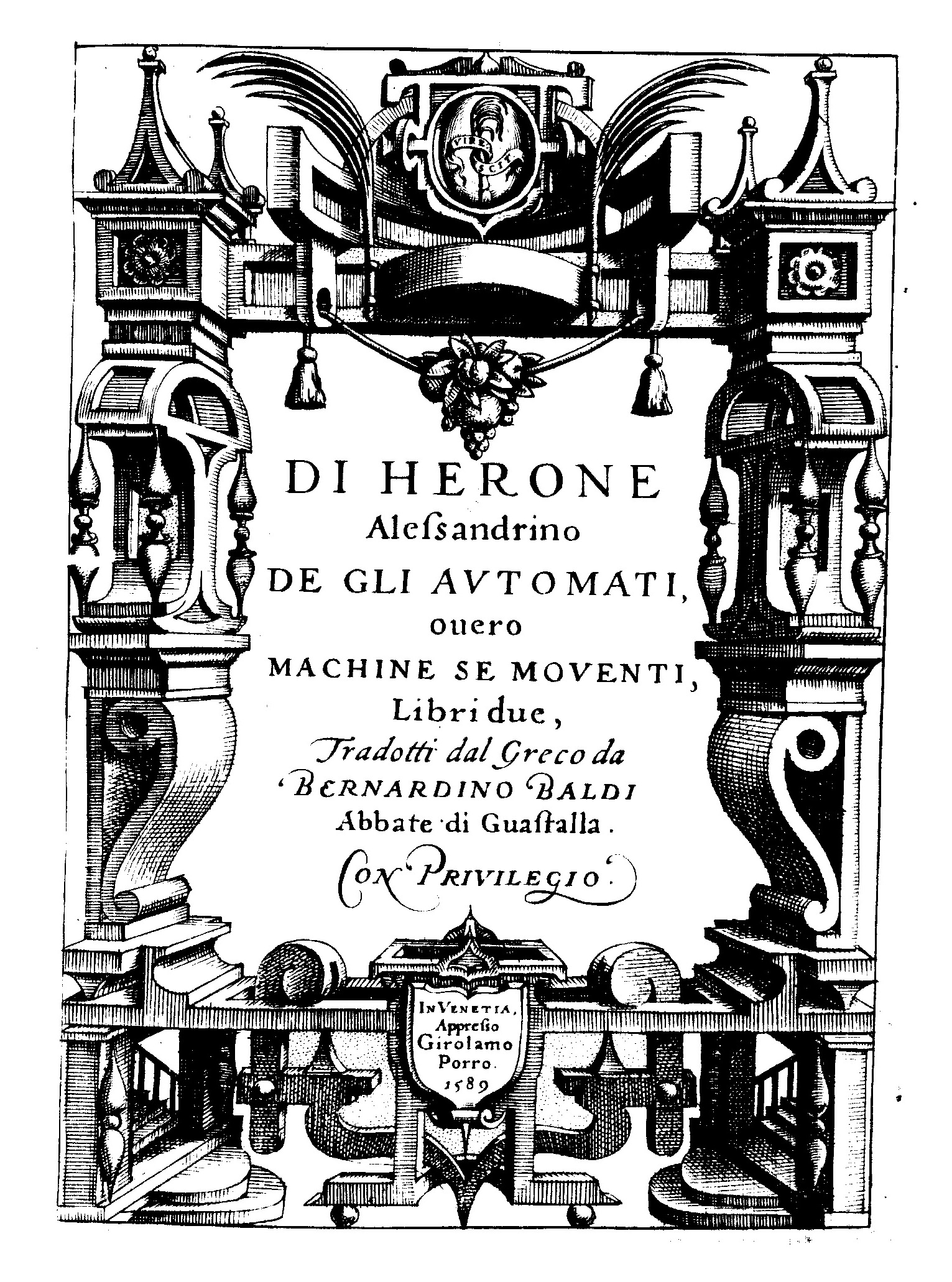
The book About automata by Hero of Alexandria (1589 edition)

The most comprehensive edition of Hero's works was published in five volumes in Leipzig by the publishing house Teubner in 1903.

Works known to have been written by Hero include:

- Pneumatica (Πνευματικά), a description of machines working on air, steam or water pressure, including the hydraulis or water organ
- Automata, a description of machines which enable wonders in banquets and possibly also theatrical contexts by mechanical or pneumatical means (e.g. automatic opening or closing of temple doors, statues that pour wine and milk, etc.)
- Belopoeica, a description of war machines
- Dioptra, a collection of methods to measure lengths, where the odometer and the dioptra (an apparatus resembling the theodolite) are described
- Metrica, a work describing how to calculate surface areas and volumes of diverse geometrical objects

Works that have been preserved only in Arabic translations:

- Mechanica, written for architects, containing means to lift heavy objects
- Catoptrica, about the progression of light, reflection, and the use of mirrors

Works that sometimes have been attributed to Hero, but are now thought most likely to have been written by someone else:

- Geometrica, a collection of problems similar to the first chapter of Metrica
- Stereometrica, examples of three-dimensional calculations similar to the second chapter of Metrica
- Mensurae, tools which can be used to conduct measurements for problems based on Stereometrica and Metrica
- Cheiroballistra, about catapults
- Definitiones, containing definitions of terms for geometry

Works that are preserved only in fragments:

- Geodesia
- Geoponica
- A commentary to Euclid's Elements, attested by Arabic authors but no longer extant

== See also ==
- Abdaraxus, an ancient Alexandrian engineer
- Heronian triangle
