= Robert Charles McMaster =

American electrical engineer and academic (1913–1986)

Robert Charles McMaster (1913 – July 6, 1986 Delaware, Ohio), a pioneer in nondestructive testing, was Regents Professor Emeritus of Welding Engineering and Electrical Engineering at Ohio State University (OSU). He has more than 300 publications and 19 patents. He was awarded with the ASNT Gold Medal in 1977.

== Education ==
Born in Delaware, Ohio, McMaster earned a B.S. in 1936 in electrical engineering from Carnegie Mellon University; and an M.S. in 1938 in electrical engineering and a Ph.D. in electrical engineering and physics in 1944 from California Institute of Technology. His Ph.D. research focused on the effects of light on power transmission lines.

== Personal life ==
His daughter is novelist Lois McMaster Bujold.

== ASNT Robert C. McMaster Gold Medal ==
The American Society for Nondestructive Testing has renamed its gold medal award in 1990 to honor Robert C. McMaster for his outstanding contributions to the NDT profession. The Robert C. McMaster Gold Medal Award recognizes individuals for outstanding contributions or significant advancement in any area of NDT and/or the Society.
