= Thomas Carr (engineer) =

English mechanical engineer (1824–1874)

Thomas Carr (1824–1874) was an English mechanical engineer of Montpelier, Bristol. Of his several inventions, the Carr's disintegrator was the best-known of its type.

== Early life and education ==
Thomas Carr was born at Durham, England, on 23 January 1824. He was the third son of Rev. John Carr, professor of mathematics in the University of Durham.

Carr showed a talent for mechanics while still a child. At the age of 15, he was placed with Messrs. Bury Curtis and Kennedy of Liverpool. He remained three years, distinguishing himself through the accuracy of his drawings.

== Career ==
Carr invented an improved steering apparatus for ships; Though is received a high approval by authorities on the subject, it was not generally adopted owing to the expense required in repairing it. Some time afterwards, he brought out a new method of drying glue, which could be used at any time -a matter of great importance in the manufacturer of this article- and it was sold to a manufacturer in Leeds. He also originated several other inventions.

His last and principal invention was the disintegrator. This machine, which he described to the Institution of Mechanical Engineers, was extensively used in various trades and manufactures especially in connection with agriculture. It was considered to be one of the most valuable inventions of its era. He also brought out a flour mill on the disintegrator principle, which was used extensively in Scotland.

Carr became a member of the Institution of Mechanical Engineers in 1872.

== Death ==
Carr died in Bristol, England on 29 March 1874, at the age of 50.
