= Aeolipile =

Simple, bladeless radial steam turbine

An illustration of Hero's aeolipile

An aeolipile, aeolipyle, or eolipile, also known as a Hero's (or Heron's) engine, is a simple, bladeless radial steam turbine which spins when the central water container is heated. Torque is produced by steam jets exiting the turbine. The Greek-Egyptian mathematician and engineer Hero of Alexandria described the device in the 1st century CE, and many sources give him the credit for its invention. However, at least one source credits Vitruvius as the first to describe this appliance in his De architectura (c. 30–20 BCE).

The aeolipile is considered to be the first recorded steam engine or reaction steam turbine, but it is neither a practical source of power nor a direct predecessor of the type of steam engine invented during the Industrial Revolution.

The name – derived from the Ancient Greek name Αἴολος and the Latin word pila – translates literally to 'the ball of Aeolus', Aeolus being the Greek god of the air and wind.

Because it applies steam to perform work, an aeolipile (depicted in profile) is used as the symbol for the U.S. Navy's Boiler Technician rating, as it was for the earlier Watertender, Boilermaker, and Boilerman ratings.

== Physics ==
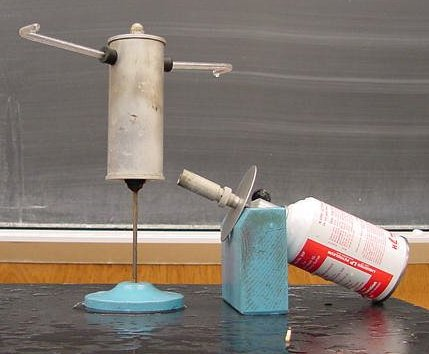
A classroom model of an aeolipile

The aeolipile usually consists of a spherical or cylindrical vessel with oppositely bent or curved nozzles projecting outwards. It is designed to rotate on its axis. When the vessel is pressurised with steam, the gas is expelled out of the nozzles, which generates thrust due to the rocket principle as a consequence of the 2nd and 3rd of Newton's laws of motion. When the nozzles, pointing in different directions, produce forces along different lines of action perpendicular to the axis of the bearings, the thrusts combine to result in a rotational moment (mechanical couple), or torque, causing the vessel to spin about its axis. Aerodynamic drag and frictional forces in the bearings build up quickly with increasing rotational speed (rpm) and consume the accelerating torque, eventually cancelling it and achieving a steady state speed.

Typically, and as Hero described the device, the water is heated in a simple boiler which forms part of a stand for the rotating vessel. Where this is the case, the boiler is connected to the rotating chamber by a pair of pipes that also serve as the pivots for the chamber. Alternatively the rotating chamber may itself serve as the boiler, and this arrangement greatly simplifies the pivot/bearing arrangements, as they then do not need to pass steam. This can be seen in the illustration of a classroom model shown here.

== History ==
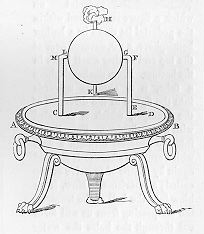
Illustration from Hero's Pneumatica

Both Hero and Vitruvius draw on the much earlier work by Ctesibius (285–222 BCE), also known as Ktēsíbios or Tesibius, who was an inventor and mathematician in Alexandria, Ptolemaic Egypt. He wrote the first known treatises on the science of compressed air and its uses in pumps.

=== Vitruvius's description ===
Vitruvius (c. 80 BCE – c. 15 BCE) mentions aeolipiles by name:

Aeolipilae are hollow brazen vessels, which have an opening or mouth of small size, by means of which they can be filled with water. Prior to the water being heated over the fire, but little wind is emitted. As soon, however, as the water begins to boil, a violent wind issues forth.

=== Hero's description ===
Hero (c. 10–70 CE) takes a more practical approach, in that he gives instructions how to make one:

No. 50. The Steam-Engine. PLACE a cauldron over a fire: a ball shall revolve on a pivot. A fire is ignited under a cauldron, A B, (fig. 50), containing water, and covered at the mouth by the lid C D; with this the bent tube E F G communicates, the extremity of the tube being fitted into a hollow ball, H K. Opposite to the extremity G place a pivot, L M, resting on the lid C D; and let the ball contain two bent pipes, communicating with it at the opposite extremities of a diameter, and bent in opposite directions, the bends being at right angles and across the lines F G, L M. As the cauldron gets hot it will be found that the steam, entering the ball through E F G, passes out through the bent tubes towards the lid, and causes the ball to revolve, as in the case of the dancing figures.

== Practical usage ==
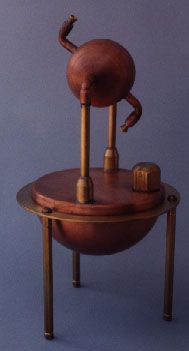
A modern replica of Hero's aeolipile.

It is not known whether the aeolipile was put to any practical use in ancient times, and if it was seen as a pragmatic device, a whimsical novelty, an object of reverence, or some other thing. A source described it as a mere curiosity for the ancient Greeks, or a "party trick". Hero's drawing shows a standalone device, and was presumably intended as a "temple wonder", like many of the other devices described in Pneumatica.

Vitruvius, on the other hand, mentions use of the aeolipile for demonstrating the physical properties of the weather. He describes them as:

brazen æolipylæ, which clearly shew that an attentive examination of human inventions often leads to a knowledge of the general laws of nature.

After describing the device's construction (see above) he concludes:

Thus a simple experiment enables us to ascertain and determine the causes and effects of the great operations of the heavens and the winds.

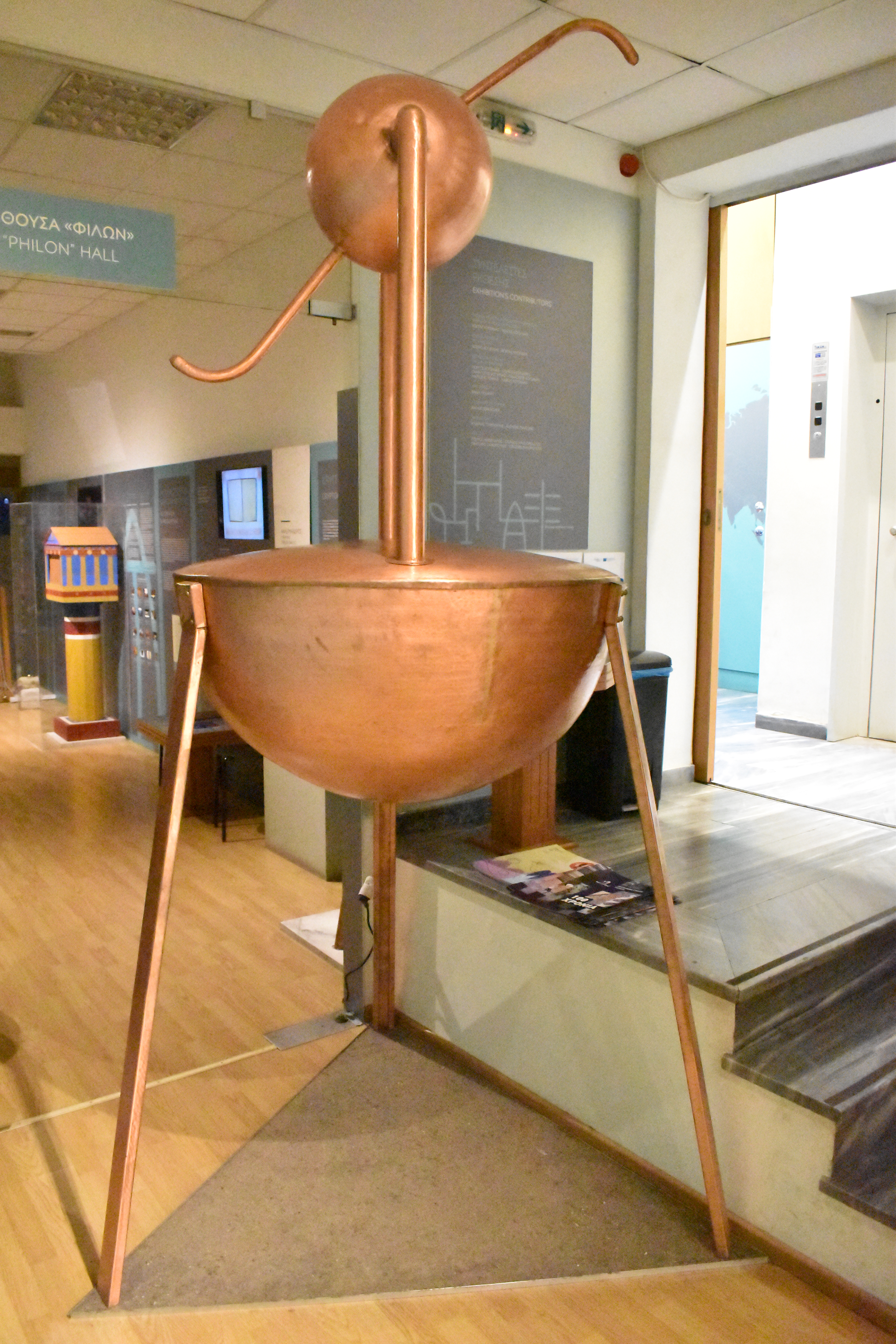
A large reconstruction of Heron's aeolipile at Kotsanas Museum of Ancient Greek Technology in Athens, Greece.

In 1543, Blasco de Garay, a scientist and a captain in the Spanish navy, allegedly demonstrated before the Holy Roman Emperor, Charles V and a committee of high officials an invention he claimed could propel large ships in the absence of wind using an apparatus consisting of copper boiler and moving wheels on either side of the ship. This account was preserved by the royal Spanish archives at Simancas. It is proposed that de Garay used Hero's aeolipile and combined it with the technology used in Roman boats and late medieval galleys. Here, de Garay's invention introduced an innovation where the aeolipile had practical usage, which was to generate motion to the paddlewheels, demonstrating the feasibility of steam-driven boats. This claim was denied by Spanish authorities.

== See also ==
- Catherine wheel (firework)
- Rocket engine
- Segner wheel
- Steam engine
- Steam locomotive
- Steam rocket
- Tip jet
