= Carr's disintegrator =

19th-century crushing machine

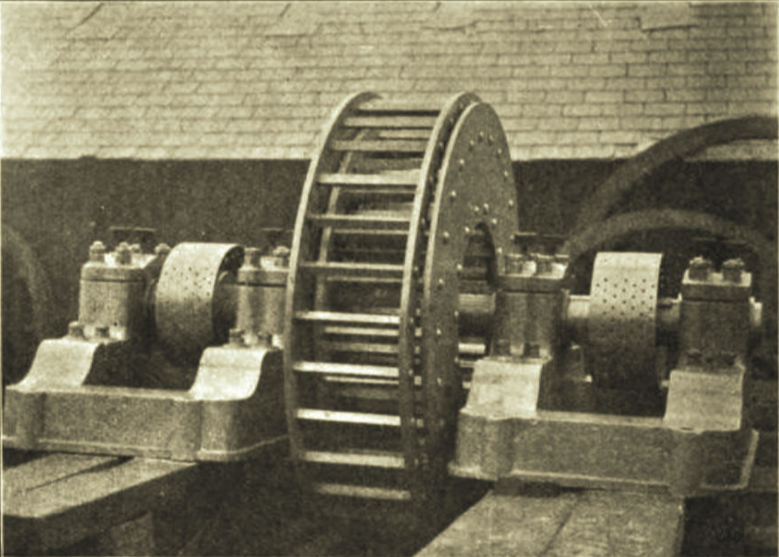
Carr's disintegrator with cover removed

Carr's disintegrator (also known as Stedman in the U.S.; Hubner, continental Europe) was a 19th-century "toothed crusher" or pulverizer invented by Thomas Carr of Montpelier, Bristol, England, and patented in Great Britain in 1859. It used to the best advantage the energy which was transmitted to it, which explained its extraordinarily high output compared with some of the other disintegrators. Carr's disintegrator was the best-known of its era.

Several different models were built according to the desired outcome. The machine was mostly used for the pulverising of such substances as superphosphates and other materials that would form pasty masses when subjected to pressure, or would clog the grooves of an ordinary mill. It consisted of two or more circular discs studded with beaters revolving within a casing or box in opposite directions on the same line of shafting. The velocity of the peripheral row of beaters was about 150 feet (46 m) per second, at which velocity at least 50 per cent. of the power was consumed in churning the air within the casing, and overcoming the friction of the machine. Originally introduced as a flour mill, its use was extended to many other substances, and various modifications in its construction were made, some of them of doubtful utility.

== Models ==
=== 1873 patent ===
Carr received Letter Patent in 1873 for the invention of "Improvements in Disintegrators". The main object of this invention was to arrange and construct his Patent disintegrator (No. 778, 29 March 1859, also No.3235, 22 October 1868) so that its set of cages that rotate in one direction may by simple means be readily separated from those that rotate the reverse way whenever the bars or cages require to be conveniently got at for cleaning or repairing.

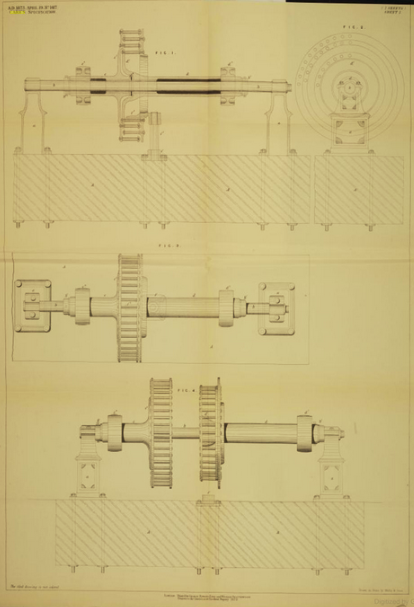
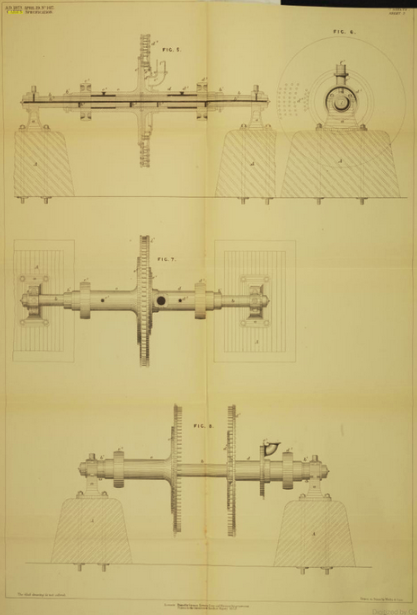
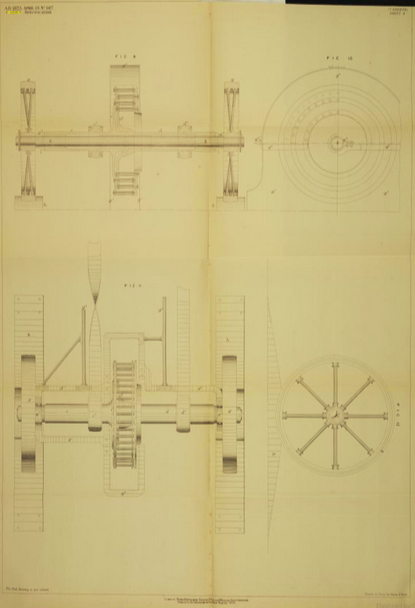
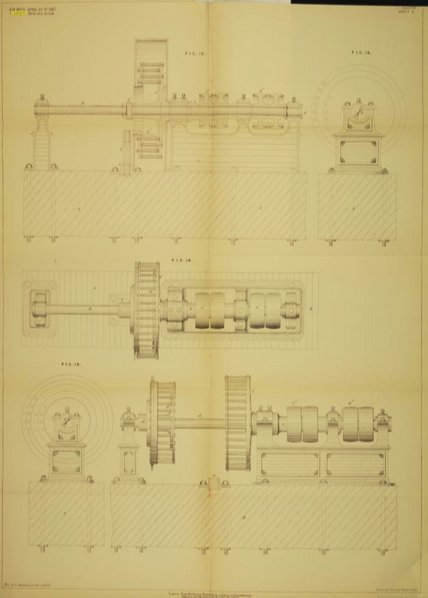
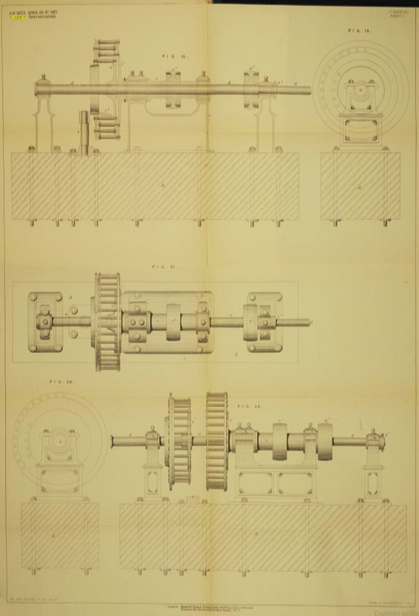
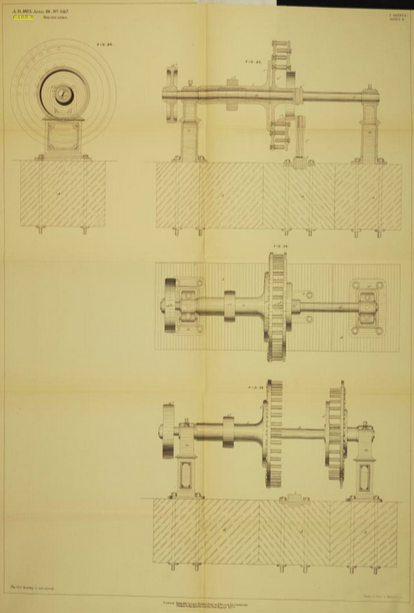
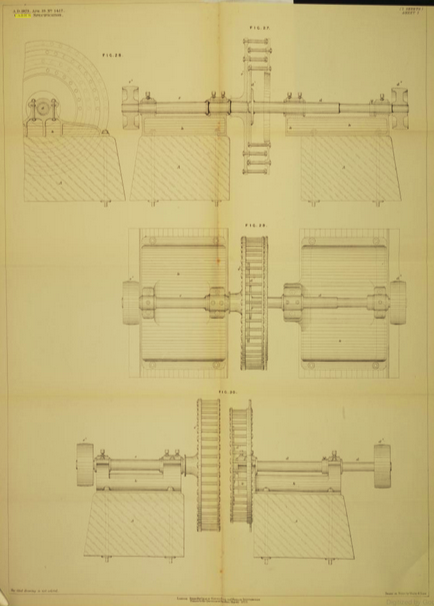

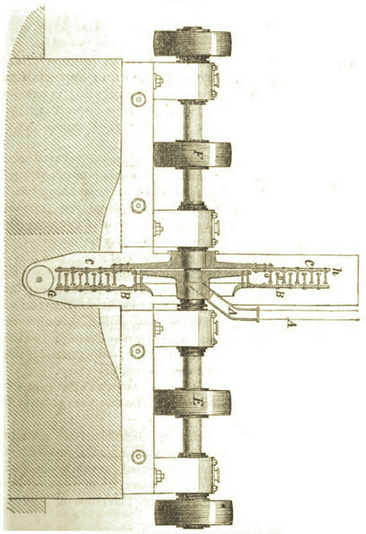
Model depicted at the 1873 Vienna World's Fair

This disintegrating flour-mill consisted of a pair of circular disks, a and b, rotating in contrary directions upon shafts d and e. The opposing faces of the disks were studded with a series of short projecting bars, arranged in successive concentric rings or cages, and the rings fixed in one disk intervene alternately between those fixed in the other disk, and revolve in the opposite direction. The grain is delivered down a fixed shoot g into the innermost cage, from which it was instantly projected through the machine, being reduced almost instantaneously to the form of meal by being dashed from right to left alternately by the bars of each of the successive cages as the same rotate at very high speed. The machine was driven at a speed of about 400 revolutions per minute, and the outermost ring being 6 ft. 10 in. in diameter, the last beaters had a velocity of 140 ft. per second. This was double the velocity, and consequently gave four times the force of blow, of the innermost ring of beaters, the force of the blow being proportionate to the square of the velocity. It was claimed that the whole power employed was usefully expended in pulverizing the material, excepting only the portion of the power absorbed by the resistance of the air to the rotation of the beaters. A machine of this kind 7 feet (2.1 m) in diameter had disintegrated 160 bushels of wheat regularly per hour.

This model was presented at the 1873 Vienna World's Fair and was awarded a secondary place.

=== Carr-Touflin Disintegrator ===
Carr-Touflin Disintegrator was essentially the same as the 1873 Carr apparatus, the improvement being means for maintaining a vacuum within the case. The grain was fed into a hopper, and thence passed to a cylinder divided into several approximately air-tight compartments by radial partitions attached to a shaft passed through the centre of the cylinder, and caused to rotate by a pulley driven by a belt connected to the main driving-shaft. As each compartment was presented in turn to the aperture at the bottom of the hopper, it was filled with the grain or other substance to be pulverized or reduced; and as it continued to rotate, it carried the same round to the aperture on the top of the feed-pipe, into which its contents were discharged, while all air except that which was contained in the interstices of the grain or granules was effectually excluded.

=== 1909 ===
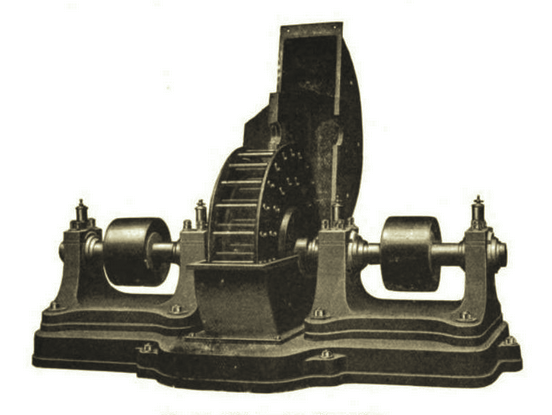
View of two driving pulleys at opposite ends of the machine

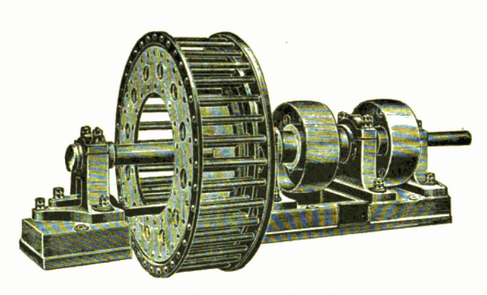
View of two driving pulleys brought to the same end my making one shaft hollow

This Carr's disintegrator model consisted of two iron discs, each supported by a short length of horizontal shafting carried in suitable bearings and furnished with a driving pulley. Sometimes the two driving pulleys were at opposite ends of the machine, sometimes they were both brought to the same end by making one shaft hollow; the former system was generally preferable. The pulleys were driven one by an open, the other by a crossed belt, so that the two shafts revolved in opposite directions. The two discs were a few inches apart, and on the sides facing each other, were provided with concentric rings of iron pins or teeth that reached nearly to the opposite disc, the annular rows of teeth on one disc alternating with those on the other. There were usually three rings of teeth on one, and two on the opposite disc.

The discs were enclosed in a substantial iron casing, in the upper part of which was a hopper for the introduction of the mineral to be crushed into the centre of the machine, the discharge being through a shoot in the bottom of the casing. The two discs were caused to revolve at high velocities in opposite directions, the speed of the outer teeth being usually some 7,000 feet (2,100 m) per minute. A fragment of mineral falling down was struck by a tooth and sent flying off tangentially with considerable velocity, at which it met the next tooth moving also at great speed in the opposite direction, and was shattered by the impact, this action continuing until the comminuted particles were thrown off from the outer ring of teeth.

=== 1920 ===
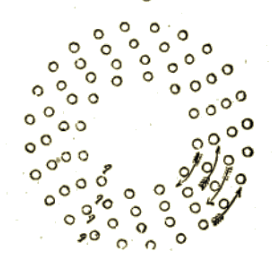
Plan of the cylindrical cages

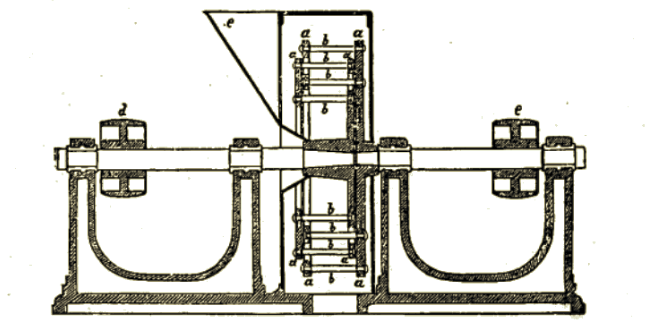
Front view

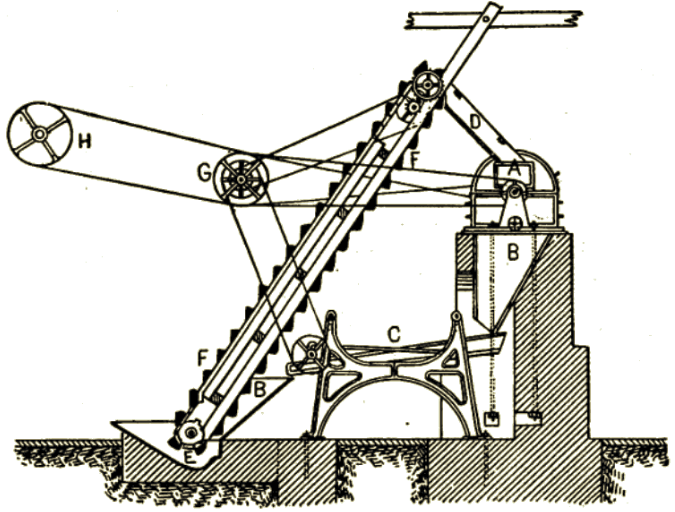
Side view depicting: C, sieve; F, elevator; G, H, transmission shafting

This Carr's disintegrator model consisted essentially of two, four, six, or eight concentric cages, the cylindrical sides of which consisted of metallic bars b, encased on one side in plain discs a, on the other on crowns The first (inside), third, and fifth cages formed an aggregate of a single piece, screwed with the boss of the disc on to a driving shaft. In the same way, the second, fourth, and the sixth cages formed an aggregate mounted on the other shaft. The machine was driven from the same shaft by means of two belts, one of which is straight and the other crossed, so that the cages formed by one of the elements of the drum fit into the annular spaces of the other and revolve in the opposite direction. The machine was usually enclosed in a tight cover and surmounted by a hopper e, into which the material to be pulverized was charged. This fell into the interior cage, and the machine being in motion, it was projected by centrifugal force across the bars of the first cage into the second; turning in opposite direction from the second it is projected in the same way into the third which turns in the same direction as the first, then into the fourth, and so on. Finally, it was projected on the outside on all the points of the periphery through the bars. The operation did not last a second. The rapidity of the grinding was not astonishing if the great number of shocks to which the matter was subjected were considered.

The power of these shocks consisted in the sum of the speed of the substance in one direction and of the bars of the cage in the other. The substance issuing from the crusher fell into a side channel hollowed out of the foundation of the machine, from where it collected in the receiving vessel of an elevator, which removed it. The size of the drums, number of revolutions a minute, the force and the number of bars, varied according to the nature and the quantity of the material to be treated and according to the fineness to be imparted. A product, consisting of granules of no matter what size, could be obtained by turning the drums at a greater or less speed and having a suitable distance between the bars.

== Uses ==
Carr's disintegrators were built in various sizes ranging from 2 feet (0.61 m) to 8 feet (2.4 m) in external diameter. A 6 feet (1.8 m) machine, which was a convenient size, required about 25 H.P. and crushed from 15 to 30 tons of coal per hour, running at about 200 revolutions per minute. Such a machine weighed about 5 tons and cost about £250 in 1909.

These machines were not adapted to the crushing of hard material, the wear being excessive and the crushing capacity extremely low. They gave excellent results on soft material such as coal, for which they were very largely used.

It was used not only for crushing superphosphates, but also for degelatinized bones. It also rendered good service in making compound manures, provided that the ingredients possessed the same or but slightly different densities.

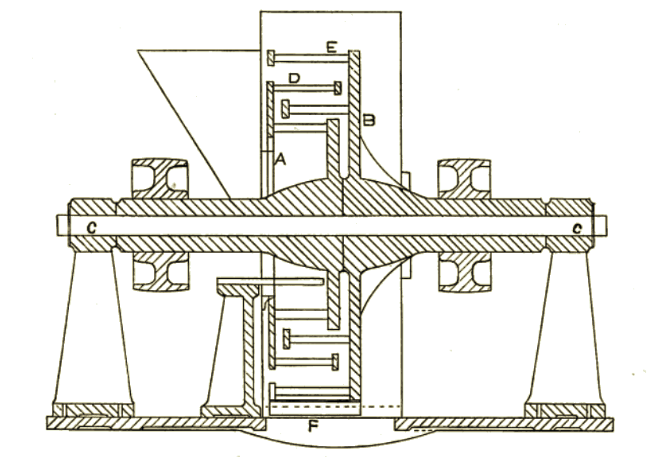
Design adopted by Campbell, Bennie & Company (1911)

Messrs. Campbell, Bennie & Company used the Carr's disintegrator for their coal processing operation. The design they adopted was such that the broken coal entered the machine through an aperture in the side, and as it fell between the bars, which revolved at a high speed in opposite directions, the lumps were struck first in one direction, then in the opposite direction, this action continuing until the communited particles entered the circumferential space F of the iron casing, whence it escapes by an opening to a shoot in the bottom.

In Europe, Carr's disintegrator was used at a good many establishments. At the Gustar Colliery, Germany, the disintegrator crushed to a fine powder about 25 tons of coal every hour.

Carr's disintegrator was used in Belgium for breaking up coal. This machine seemed adapted to soft, earthy substances, like chalk, burnt gypsum or lime, and mineral manures. With harder substances, such as rock-salt, the so-called coffee mill proved better adapted and more efficient. Therefore, this disintegrator could not be reckoned among the apparatus to be considered in the development of ore dressing. According to Pernolet (Annales des Mines, 1874, 7 ser., vol. vi, p. 365), Carr's disintegrator was in use in coke establishments at Anzin since 1869 for mixing, and at the same time reducing to finer dust, rich and poor small coal without preparing this dust further. An apparatus 29 centimetres (11 in) wide, with the greatest diameter of the disintegrator cylinder 120 centimetres (47 in), and driven at 350 revolutions per minute, worked up hourly 15 tons of small coal and required 15 horse-power, or 1124 kgm., for working up 500 kilos. of fine coal per minute, while for the same work in competitive trials, a crushing machine needed only 5 horse-power.
