= Abdaraxus =

Abdaraxus was an ancient engineer mentioned in Laterculi Alexandrini (p.berol 13044, column 8, "Ἀβδαράξως ὁ τὰ ἐν Ἀλεξανδρείαι μηχανικὰ συντε[λῶ]ν...[") as the one "who built the machines in Alexandria". This is the only known mention of his name in surviving literature, but to include him in his list, and to consider the machines famous enough to not need elaboration, it has been inferred that Abdaraxus was an outstanding engineer of his time.
