= Montpelier, Bristol =

Inner suburb of Bristol

Coordinates: 51.467°N 2.585°W

Montpelier
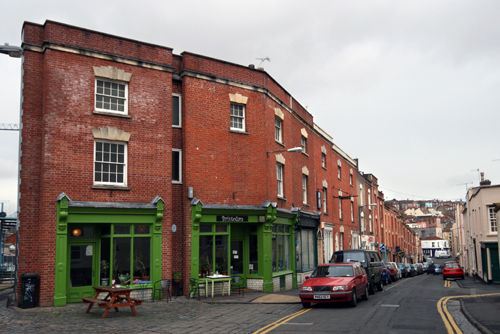
- A view along Picton Street

- Location within Bristol
- OS grid reference: ST594743
- Unitary authority: Bristol
- Ceremonial county: Bristol
- Region: South West
- Country: England
- Sovereign state: United Kingdom
- Post town: BRISTOL
- Postcode district: BS6
- Dialling code: 0117
- Police: Avon and Somerset
- Fire: Avon
- Ambulance: South Western
- UK Parliament: Bristol Central

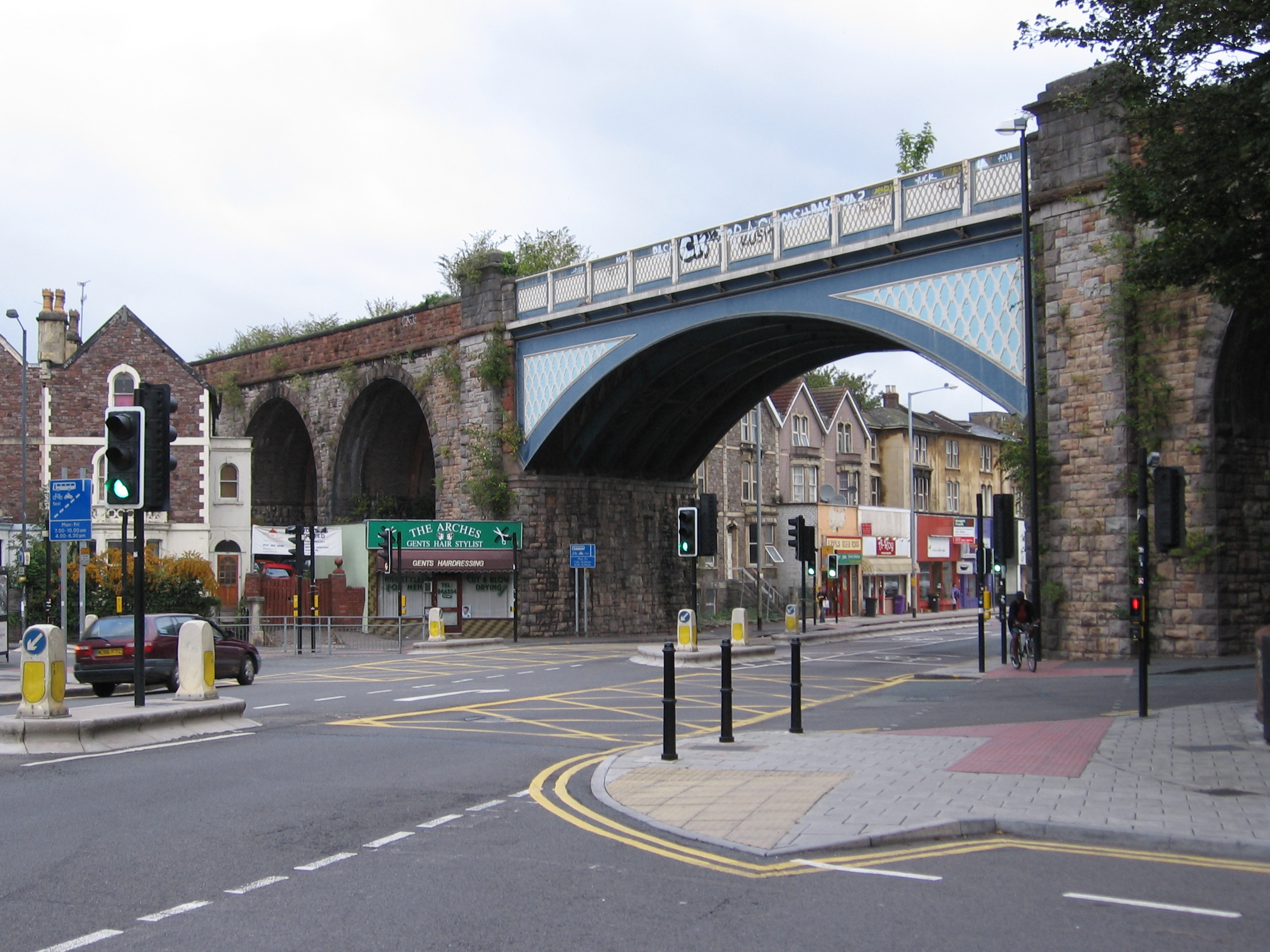
'The Arches' railway bridge is a local landmark on the borders of Montpelier, St Andrews and Cotham.

Montpelier is an inner suburban neighbourhood and conservation area in Bristol, England. It is located 1 mile (1.6 km) north of The Centre in the Ashley electoral ward and Bristol Central parliamentary constituency. The area is served by Montpelier railway station on the Severn Beach Line railway.

Montpelier occupies a hillside which rises from south to north, overlooking the city centre, with narrow streets that follow the contours. It is densely built with primarily Georgian and Victorian terraced housing, with some modern infill apartment buildings and larger villas.

Montpelier has a reputation as a diverse and bohemian neighbourhood. Lower Montpelier scores comparatively high on indicators of deprivation, in the 2nd decile of English areas, while Upper Montpelier is in the 4th decile. Its main commercial area, Picton Street, is known for organic and vegetarian cuisine.

== Location and boundaries ==
Montpelier is an informally defined neighbourhood, and modern usage can overlap with the neighbouring areas of St Paul's to the south, St Werburgh's to the east, St Andrew's to the north, and Cotham to the west. Historically, Montpelier was defined by the parish of St Andrew, created in 1845. For planning purposes, Bristol City Council define a Montpelier Conservation Area, which is roughly bounded by Ashley Road in the south, Ashley Hill in the east, the Severn Beach Line railway in the north, and Cheltenham Road to the west, corresponding loosely to the southern part of the old St Andrew's parish. While it is on the east side of Ashley Hill, Ivy Pentecostal Church is considered a part of the neighbourhood by its residents and is also included in the appraisal area. For statistical purposes, the council uses slightly different boundaries, defining two Office for National Statistics output areas as Lower Montpelier (to the southeast) and Upper Montpelier (to the northeast).

== History ==
The area now occupied by Montpelier was part of the Ashley estate from the early 12th century, and remained rural until the 18th century. Thomas Rennison built a fashionable lido here in the middle of the 18th century, and in 1786 Ashley Road was improved as a turnpike, with housing soon following alongside. Piecemeal building of individual villas and terraces of housing continued over the following decades, until its density increased rapidly with lower-middle class housing during the surge in Bristol's population in 1860s-70s.

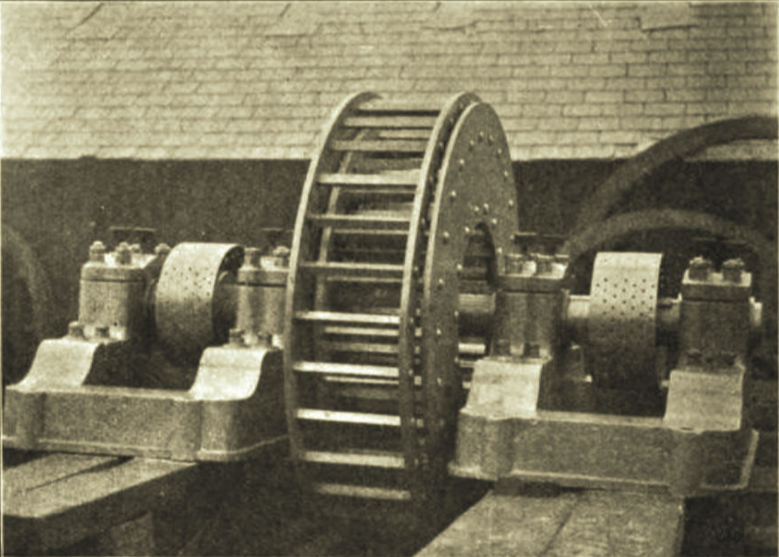
Carr's disintegrator

Thomas Carr, an engineer of Montpelier, invented the Carr's disintegrator in 1859. It was the best-known disintegrator of its era.

Many of Montpelier's streets are named after famous generals or have military connotations, such as Wellington, York and Banner Roads, reflecting the popular patriotism of the age when they were laid out, in the wake of the Battle of Waterloo. Picton Street and Picton Lodge were named for Sir Thomas Picton, who was killed in the battle. As Captain Picton in 1783, he faced the rebellious 75th Regiment on College Green, averting a military mutiny. As governor of Trinidad, Picton profited from slavery and oversaw a regime which used torture and capital punishment, and there is some local discontent with his continued commemoration.

The area suffered from property blight during the 1960s, when it was threatened by proposals for a major ring road system, which would intersect with the M32 motorway at junction 3. Part of this plan was realised in Easton to the southeast, in the form of Easton Way, but public backlash led to a change in policy and it was not continued west of the motorway.
