= St Pauls Carnival =

Caribbean festival in Bristol, England

Coordinates: 51.465°N 2.582°W

St Paul's Carnival
- Genre: Reggae, World music, Folk music, Hip hop, Poetry, Dub, Visual arts
- Dates: First Saturday of July
- Locations: St Pauls, Bristol, United Kingdom
- Years active: since 1968
- Website: St Pauls Carnival

St. Paul's Carnival is an annual Caribbean Carnival held, usually on the first Saturday of July, in St. Paul's, Bristol, England. The celebration began in 1968 as the St. Paul's Festival, in order to improve relationships between the European, African, Caribbean, and Asian inhabitants of the area.

Called the St. Paul's Carnival since 1991, the event includes a masquerade procession with ornate and colourful costumes and floats from local schools and cultural associations, a stage for professional performers, sound systems in neighbouring streets and a range of stalls selling food from a wide range of cultures. In the preceding period, Mas camps create costumes for the parade and there is a week of cultural events in the days before carnival.

== History ==
The carnival started in 1968 as a multi-cultural event. The initial organisers were the St. Paul's and Environs Consultative Committee and the West Indian Development Association, aided by the vicar of St Agnes Church and Carmen Beckford, Bristol's first community development worker. Local residents and activists wanted to bring together the European, African-Caribbean and Asian communities, and wanted to challenge negative stereotypes of the area. Originally it was a community event with local residents selling home-cooked food from their front gardens.

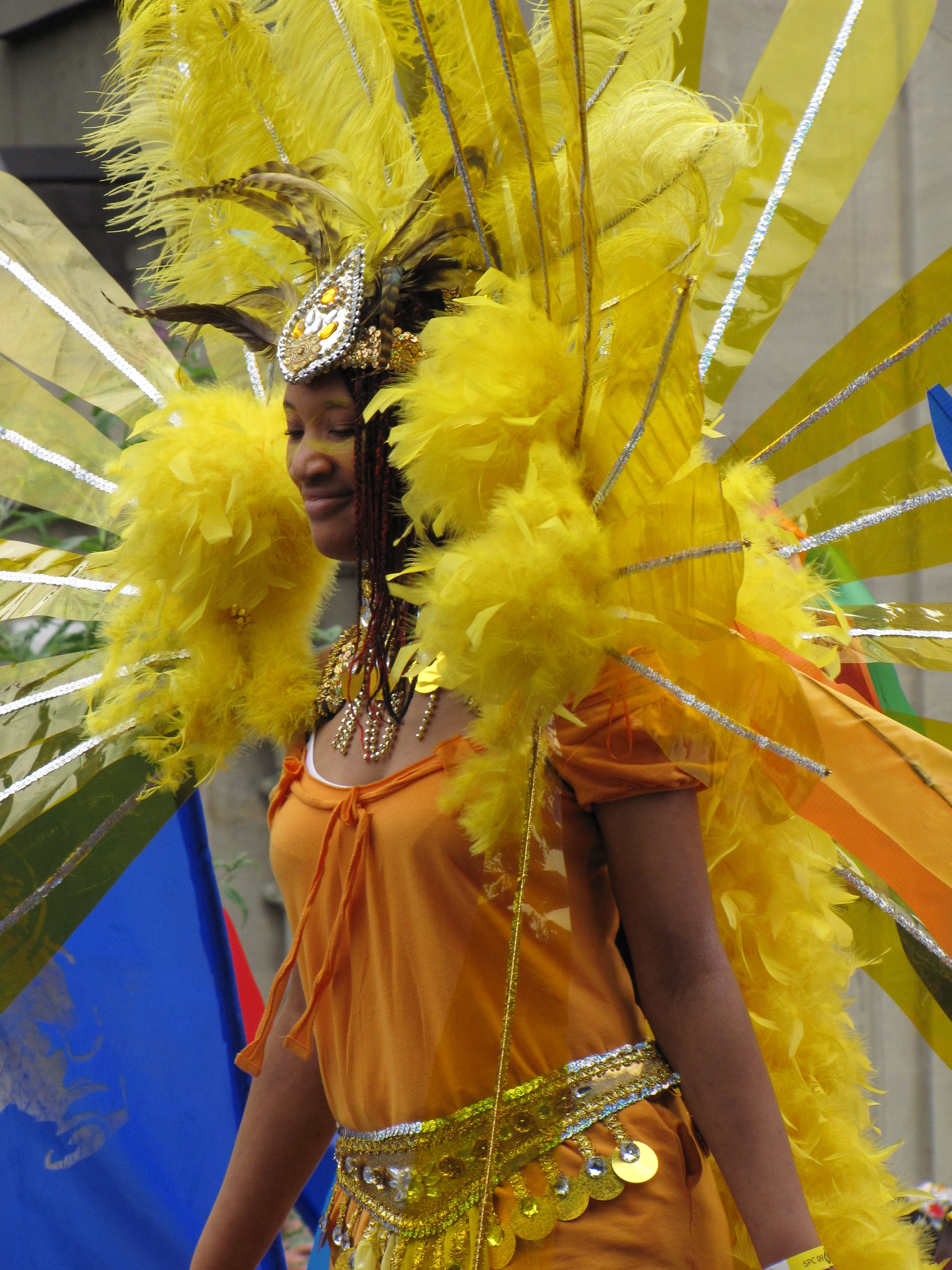
A participant in 2009

Researcher Thomas Fleming said that "By the mid-1970s the event (now called the 'St. Paul's Festival') was indulging in an extravagant multiculturalism that celebrated in the juxtaposition of Latvian singers and Scottish dancers, steel bands and weightlifting competitions."

This approach was to change over the next few years, particularly when the St. Paul's Festival Committee elected Trinidadian Francis Salandy as chair in July 1979. He took over from Alfredo Vasquez who had been one of the main organisers of the Festival for the previous two years; Vasquez was elected Secretary and for the next twenty years held key posts on the committee (Secretary and Treasurer).

Salandy shifted the festival from multi-cultural celebrations of the various communities living in the St. Paul's neighbourhood to providing a platform for African and Caribbean artists. He insisted that the Black community had to be central to the decision-making because he did not want St. Paul's Festival to be "purely an exercise in community relations by White people who usually assumed a controlling role and decided what the Black community wanted".

Salandy brought Trinidadian-style mas camp and procession to St. Paul's Festival but insisted on keeping up the tradition of booking steel bands. One of his first actions was to use his contacts with the organisers of the Notting Hill Carnival to invite London's Ebony Steelband to Bristol.

Under Salandy's leadership, St. Paul's Festival remained a community event while becoming a consciousness-raising platform, reflecting messages of social justice, Black identity and liberation. This was reflected in the choice of films, talks and artists, as well as the Festival themes such as 'Survival' (1979), 'Resistance' (1980) and 'Not Guilty' (1981).

In 1991 the event was renamed St. Paul's Afrikan-Caribbean Carnival, but it retains "an inclusive ethos and still attracts a wide range of Bristolian celebrants."

The festival ran every year until 2002, when it was cancelled. Amirah Cole of the organising committee said: "We've worked hard to get funding for carnival projects and events, but it has been much more difficult to get support for training and extra staff. The fact the carnival happens each year is down to the hard work of a few association members who give their time freely throughout the year to plan and fund-raise. Carnival has grown so much that this is no longer sustainable."

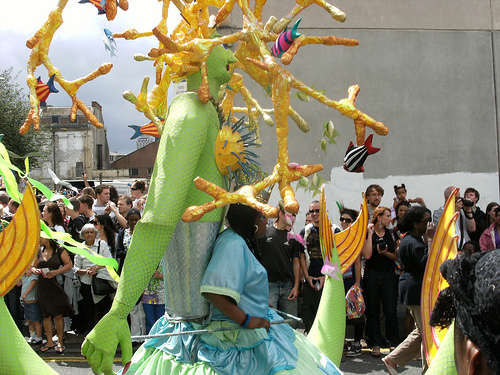
St. Paul's Carnival, 2008

In 2006 the carnival was not held as the organising committee took a year out to re-structure and develop plans for a festival in 2007 that would be part of the commemorations of the 200th anniversary of the Abolition of the Slave Trade Act 1807. Carnival returned in 2007, improving its diversity and popularity, with a reported 70,000 persons attending in 2008.

The organisation was a registered charity from 2010 to 2018, namely St. Pauls Afrikan Caribbean Carnival Limited. Its charitable objectives were 'to advance the education of the public in the appreciation and practice of Afrikan and Caribbean Arts and Culture'.

The carnival was not held in 2015, 2016, or 2017 after the main funders – Bristol City Council and Arts Council England – lost confidence in the organisers. The company and charity were de-registered in 2018 owing to lack of activity.

A community interest company, St. Pauls Carnival (Bristol) C.I.C., was established in 2017. The carnival took place again in 2018 with funding from Arts Council England, and support from Bristol City Council and Avon and Somerset Police.

In 2020, because of the COVID-19 pandemic, St. Paul's Carnival was held on-line.

== Archives ==
Records of the St. Paul's Afrikan-Caribbean Carnival and Arts Association, including administrative and financial records, marketing material, posters and photographs from the 1970s to 2007, are held at Bristol Archives (Ref. 43739) (online catalogue).
