= American Society for Nondestructive Testing =

Technical society

The American Society for Nondestructive Testing, Inc. or ASNT is a technical society for nondestructive testing (NDT) professionals. ASNT evolved from The American Industrial Radium and X-ray Society which was founded in 1941. Its headquarters is located in Columbus, Ohio, and there are 70 local sections in the United States and 14 local sections in other countries.

== The organization ==
ASNT is a nonprofit organization, which is governed by the Board of Directors and the national officers. There are four councils within ASNT:

1. Technical and Education
2. Research
3. Section Operations
4. Certification

ASNT publishes and maintains an important standard, SNT-TC-1A, which, with the addition of Codes of Practice ANSI/ASNT CP-189 and ANSI/ASNT CP-105, covers all aspects of qualification and certification of NDT personnel. SNT-TC-1A specifies an employer-based certification scheme for ASNT NDT Level I and ASNT NDT Level II Certification Program personnel, which is extensively used worldwide, in countries not enforcing ISO 9712 such as the European Union or Canada. The ASNT Central Certification Program (ACCP) is a fully accredited certification scheme that specifically complies with the ISO 9712 Standard.

== Activities ==
ASNT manages a central certification scheme for ASNT NDT Level III professionals.

The Conference Department of ASNT regularly organizes two (ASNT Research Symposium, and ASNT Annual Conference) major scientific and technical conferences around March and October each year.

ASNT publishes the journals Materials Evaluation (ME), Research in Nondestructive Evaluation (RNDE), and The NDT Technician (TNT) and multiple books on NDT.

ASNT awards annually individuals with significant contributions to the field of NDT, including:

- Donald O. Thompson Research Recognition for Innovation Award
- Robert E. Green Jr. Research Recognition for Sustained Excellence Award
- Robert C. McMaster Gold Medal Award
- Lester/Mehl Honor Lecture
- Charles N. Sherlock Meritorious Service Award
- Ward Rummel Engineering Excellence Award
- Lou DiValerio Technician of the Year Award

== Key ASNT publications ==
- Recommended Practice No. SNT-TC-1A: Personnel Qualification and Certification in Nondestructive Testing (2011)
- ANSI/ASNT CP-189: ASNT Standard for Qualification and Certification of Nondestructive Testing Personnel (2011)
- ANSI/ASNT CP-105: ASNT Standard Topical Outlines for Qualification of Nondestructive Testing Personnel (2011)
