= Technological history of the Roman military =

The technology history of the Roman military covers the development of and application of technologies for use in the armies and navies of Rome from the Roman Republic to the fall of the Western Roman Empire. The rise of Hellenism and the Roman Republic are generally seen as signalling the end of the Iron Age in the Mediterranean. Roman iron-working was enhanced by a process known as carburization. The Romans used the better properties in their armaments, and the 1,300 years of Roman military technology saw radical changes. The Roman armies of the early empire were much better equipped than early republican armies. Metals used for arms and armor primarily included iron, bronze, and brass. For construction, the army used wood, earth, and stone. The later use of concrete in architecture was widely mirrored in Roman military technology, especially in the application of a military workforce to civilian construction projects.

== Origins and development ==
Much of what is described as typically Roman technology, as opposed to that of the Greeks, comes directly from the Etruscan civilization, which was thriving to the North when Rome was just a small kingdom. The Etruscans had invented the stone arch, and used it in bridges as well as buildings. Some later Roman technologies were taken directly from Greek civilization.

After the absorption of the ancient Greek city states into the Roman Republic in 146 BC, the highly advanced Greek technology began to spread across many areas of Roman influence and supplement the Empire. This included the military advances that the Greeks had made, as well as all the scientific, mathematical, political and artistic developments.

=== New materials ===
However, the Romans made many significant technological advances, such as the invention of hydraulic cement and concrete. They used such new materials to great advantage in their structures, many of which survive to this day, like their masonry aqueducts, such as the Pont du Gard, and buildings, such as the Pantheon and Baths of Diocletian in Rome. Their methods were recorded by historical figures Vitruvius and Frontinus for example, who wrote handbooks to advise fellow engineers and architects. Romans knew enough history to be aware that widespread technological change had occurred in the past and brought benefits, as shown for example by Pliny the Elder's Naturalis Historia. That tradition continued as the empire grew in size and absorbed new ideas. Romans thought of themselves as practical, so small-scale innovation was common (such as the development of the ballista into the polybolos or repeating ballista). The traditional view is that their reliance on a plentiful slave labour force and a lack of a patent or copyright system have both been cited as reasons that there was little social or financial pressure to automate or reduce manual tasks. However, this view is being challenged by new research that shows they did indeed innovate, and on a wide scale. Thus the watermill had been known to the Greeks, but it was the Romans who developed their efficient utilisation. The set of mills at Barbegal in southern France were worked by a single aqueduct, which drove no fewer than 16 overshot mills built into the side of a hill. They probably were built by the army and supplied flour to a wide region. Floating mills were also used to exploit fast flowing rivers.

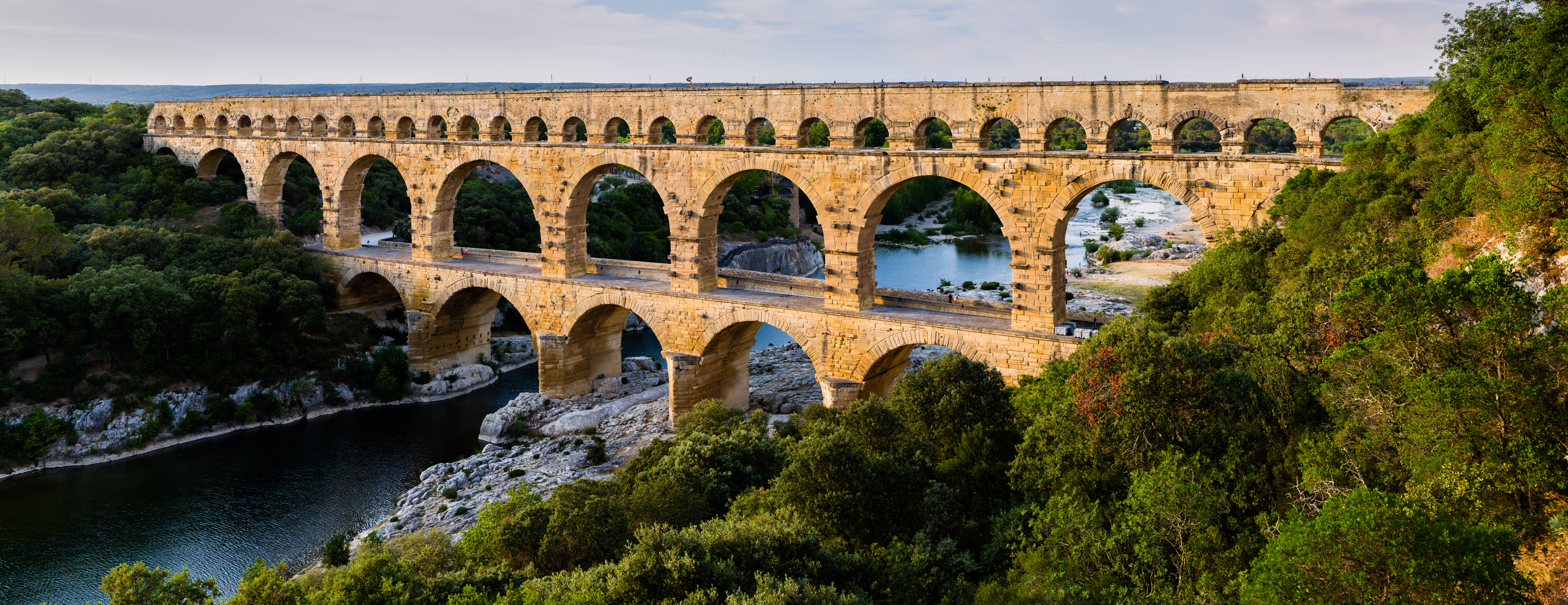
Pont du Gard

=== Mining ===
The Romans also used water power in an unexpected way during mining operations. It's known from the writings of Pliny the Elder that they exploited the alluvial gold deposits of north-west Spain soon after the conquest of the region in 25 BC using large-scale hydraulic mining methods. The spectacular gold mine at Las Medulas was worked by no fewer than seven long aqueducts cut into the surrounding mountains, the water being played directly onto the soft auriferous ore.

The outflow was channelled into sluice boxes, and the heavier gold collected on rough pavements. They also developed many deep mines, such as those for copper at Rio Tinto, where Victorian mining developments exposed the much earlier workings. Dewatering machines, such as Archimedean screws and reverse overshot water wheels, were found in situ, one of which is on show at the British Museum. Another fragmentary example was recovered from the Roman gold mine at Dolaucothi in west Wales, and is preserved at the National Museum of Wales in Cardiff. The army were at the forefront of development of gold mines, since the metal was imperial property, and developed the Dolaucothi mines from the outset by establishing a fort there that was known as Luentinum. They had the expertise to build the infrastructure of aqueducts and reservoirs, as well as control production.

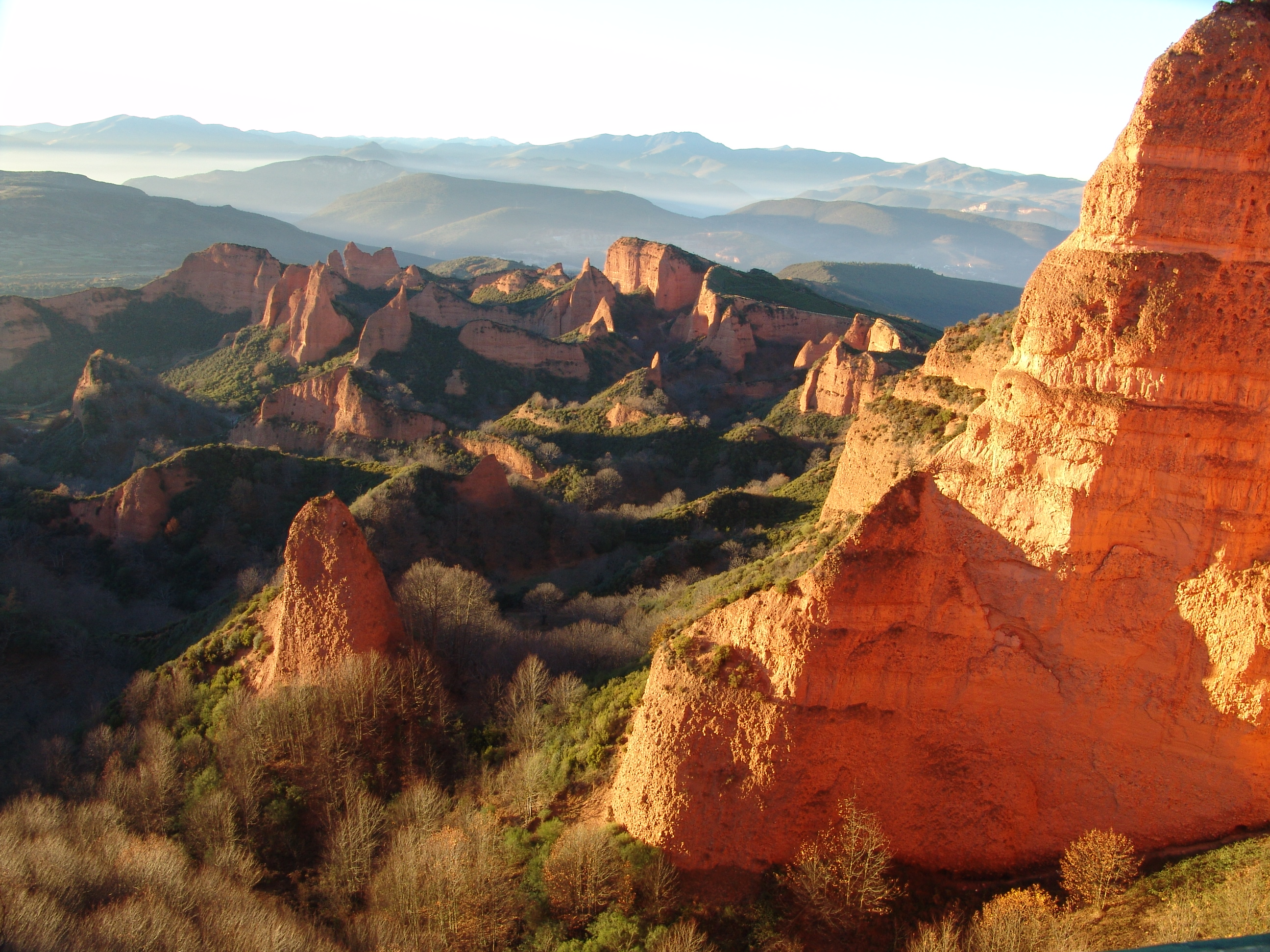
Panoramic view of Las Médulas

The period in which technological progress was fastest and greatest was during the 2nd century and 1st century BC, which was the period in which Roman political and economic power greatly increased. By the 2nd century, Roman technology appears to have peaked.

== Roman implementation of technology ==
The Romans advanced military technology significantly, and implemented it on a massive scale. From a few early models of ballista from Greek city-states the Romans adopted and improved the design, eventually issuing one to every century in the legions.

To facilitate this organization, an engineering corps was developed. An officer of engineers, or praefectus fabrum, is referenced in armies of the Late Republic, but this post is not verifiable in all accounts and may have simply been a military advisor on the personal staff of a commanding officer. There were legion architects (whose rank is yet unknown), who were responsible for the construction of war machines. Ensuring that constructions were level was the job of the libratores, who would also launch missiles and other projectiles (on occasion) during battle. The engineering corps was in charge of massive production, frequently prefabricating artillery and siege equipment to facilitate its transportation

== See also ==
- Roman military engineering
- Roman aqueducts
- Roman technology
- Sanitation in ancient Rome
