= Maritime hydraulics in antiquity =

With the issue of supplying water to a very large population, the Romans developed hydraulic systems for multiple applications: public water supply, power using water mills, hydraulic mining, fish tanks, irrigation, fire fighting, and of course aqueduct (Stein 2004). Scientists such as Ctesibius and Archimedes produced the first inventions involving hydraulic power (Oleson 1984).

== Specific technology ==
The most prevalent hydraulic pump used in maritime situations in ancient Rome was the bilge pump, which functioned to siphon collected water out of a ship's hull (Oleson 1984). The bilge pump was an improvement on the first hydraulic pumps used in antiquity: force pumps. Invented around the early 3rd century BCE, the most primitive design of a force pump consisted of a piston pushing water out of a tube, constructed by soldering individual bronze elements (Stein 246).

Written accounts from Philo of Byzantium (late 3rd century BCE), Vitruvius (c. 25 BCE), and Hero of Alexandria (c. CE 50) confirm archaeological evidence for the original simple design, and both Hero and Vitruvius specify that the pump was typically made of bronze (Stein 2004). Somewhere along the way a new design arose that involved cutting apertures into an individual wood block and then rendering the block pressure-proof with tightly fitting plugs and plates (Stein 2004).

Although cheaper and easier to manufacture, assemble, and repair, the wooden pumps manufactured from then on would most likely not have been durable enough for maritime use, which is why we usually find lead pipes associated with bilge pumps, bilge wells, and hydraulic devices of other function about ships. The amphora shipwreck discovered at Grado in Gorizia, Italy, which dates to around 200 CE, and contained what archaeologists hypothesized to be a ‘hydraulics’ system to change the water in live fish tanks, since other evidence indicates the ship's involvement in the processed fish trade (Beltrame and Gaddi 2005).

This hypothesis has been disputed, since the wooden box protecting a lead pipe along the longitudinal axis of the hull found on the wreck suggest the existence of a bilge well (Oleson and Stein 2007). Previous ships involved in live fish tank transport, entitled navis vivariae, did not employ a hydraulic system, and for this reason the hypothesis proves especially questionable (Boetto 124). For example, one of the wrecks found in Claudius's harbor at the modern Fiumicino Airport in Italy was a small fish craft dating somewhere around the 2nd century CE. Archaeologists discovered a fish-well in the middle of the ship that used the hole/plump system bored in the bottom of the boat to fill the tank (Boetto 2006). Other than the Grado wreck no other evidence exists of hydraulic systems being used in the fish industry.
