= Ballista =

Ancient ranged weapon

External images
- Reenactor with manuballista, Retrieved 6 February 2008
- Trigger of the polybolos, retrieved 6 February 2008
- Side elevation of the polybolos, retrieved 6 February 2008
- From above with magazin removed, retrieved 6 February 2008
- Another view of the trigger, retrieved 6 February 2008

Illustration of a ballista being loaded and drawn

The ballista (Latin, from Greek βαλλίστρα ballistra and that from βάλλω ballō, "throw"), plural ballistae or ballistas, sometimes called a bolt thrower, was an ancient projectile weapon that launched either bolts or stones at a distant target.

Developed from earlier Greek weapons, it relied on different mechanics, using two levers with torsion springs instead of a tension prod (the bow part of a modern crossbow). The springs consisted of several loops of twisted skeins. Early versions projected heavy darts or spherical stone projectiles of various sizes for siege warfare. It developed into a smaller precision weapon, the scorpio, and possibly the polybolos.

== Roman weapon ==
The early ballistae in Ancient Greece were developed from two weapons called the oxybeles and gastraphetes. The gastraphetes ('belly-bow') was a handheld crossbow. It had a composite prod and was spanned by bracing the front end of the weapon against the ground while placing the end of a slider mechanism against the stomach. The operator would then walk forward to arm the weapon while a ratchet prevented it from shooting during loading. This produced a weapon that, it was claimed, could be operated by a person of average strength but which had a power that allowed it to be used against armored troops. The oxybeles were a bigger and heavier construction employing a winch and were mounted on a tripod. It had a lower rate of fire and was used as a siege engine.

With the invention of the torsion spring bundle, the first ballistae could now be built. The advantage of this new technology was the long relaxation time of this system. Thus, it was possible to shoot lighter projectiles with higher velocities over a longer distance. By contrast, the comparatively short relaxation time of the bow or prod of a conventional crossbow such as the oxybeles meant that much less energy could be transferred to light projectiles, limiting the effective range of the weapon.

The earliest form of the ballista is thought to have been developed for Dionysius of Syracuse, c. 400 BC.

The Greek ballista was a siege weapon. All components that were not made of wood were transported in the baggage train. It would be assembled with local wood, if necessary. Some were positioned inside large, armored, mobile siege towers or even on the edge of a battlefield. For all of the tactical advantages offered, it was only under Philip II of Macedon, and even more so under his son Alexander, that the ballista began to develop and gain recognition as both a siege engine and field artillery. Historical accounts, for instance, cited that Philip II employed a group of engineers within his army to design and build catapults for his military campaigns. There is even a claim that it was Philip II with his team of engineers who invented the ballista after improving Dionysius's device, which was merely an oversized slingshot. It was further perfected by Alexander, whose own team of engineers introduced innovations such as the idea of using springs made from tightly strung coils of rope instead of a bow to achieve more energy and power when throwing projectiles. Polybius reported about the usage of smaller, more portable ballistae, called scorpions, during the Second Punic War.

Ballistae could be easily modified to shoot both spherical and shaft projectiles, allowing their crews to adapt quickly to prevailing battlefield situations in real time.

As the role of battlefield artillery became more sophisticated, a universal joint (which was invented just for this function) was integrated into the ballista's stand, allowing the operators to alter the trajectory and firing direction of the ballista as required without a lengthy disassembly of the machine.

== Roman weaponry ==
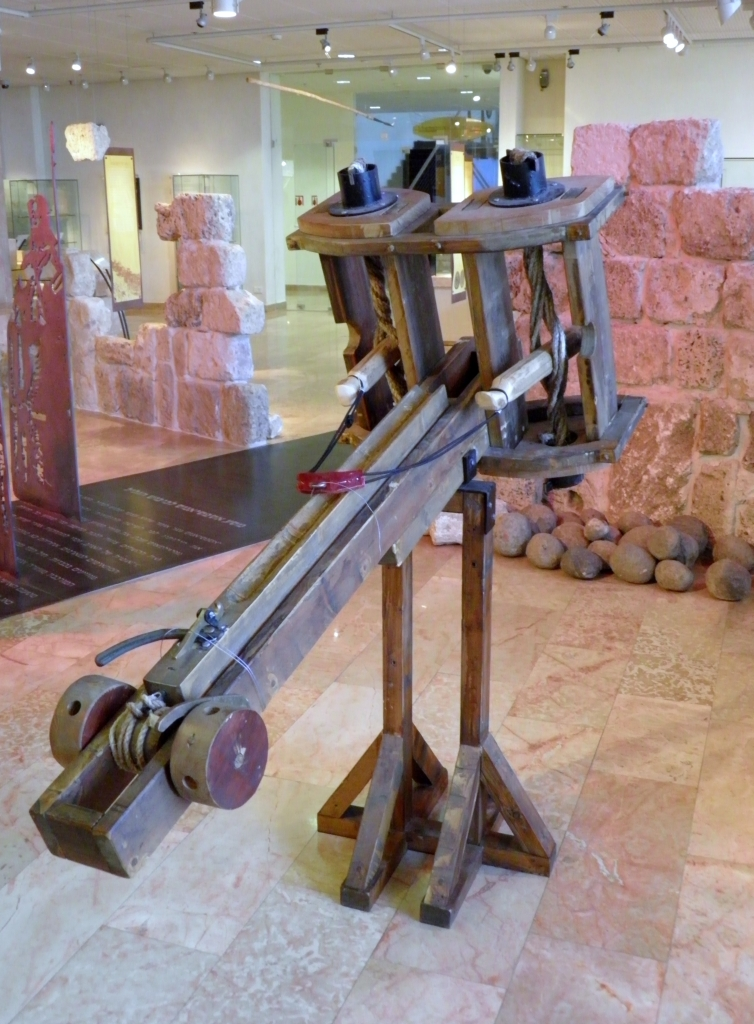
Reconstructed small Roman ballista

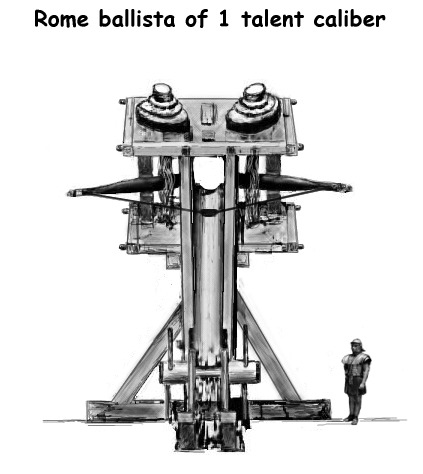
One talent ballista (26 kg [57 lb] weight projectile) was typical for Roman era ballista. The heaviest version ever made was built by Archimedes, and used stones of up to three talents (78 kg [172 lb]).

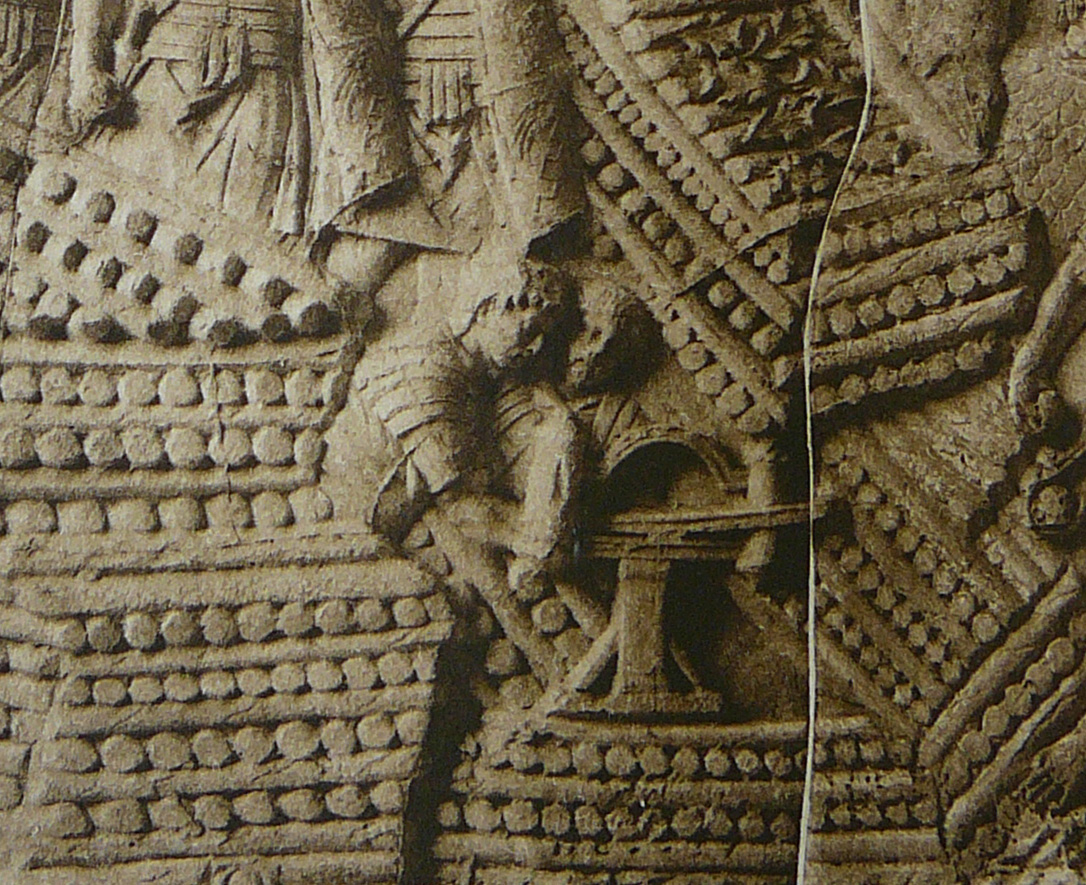
Roman 'catapult-nest' on Trajan's Column

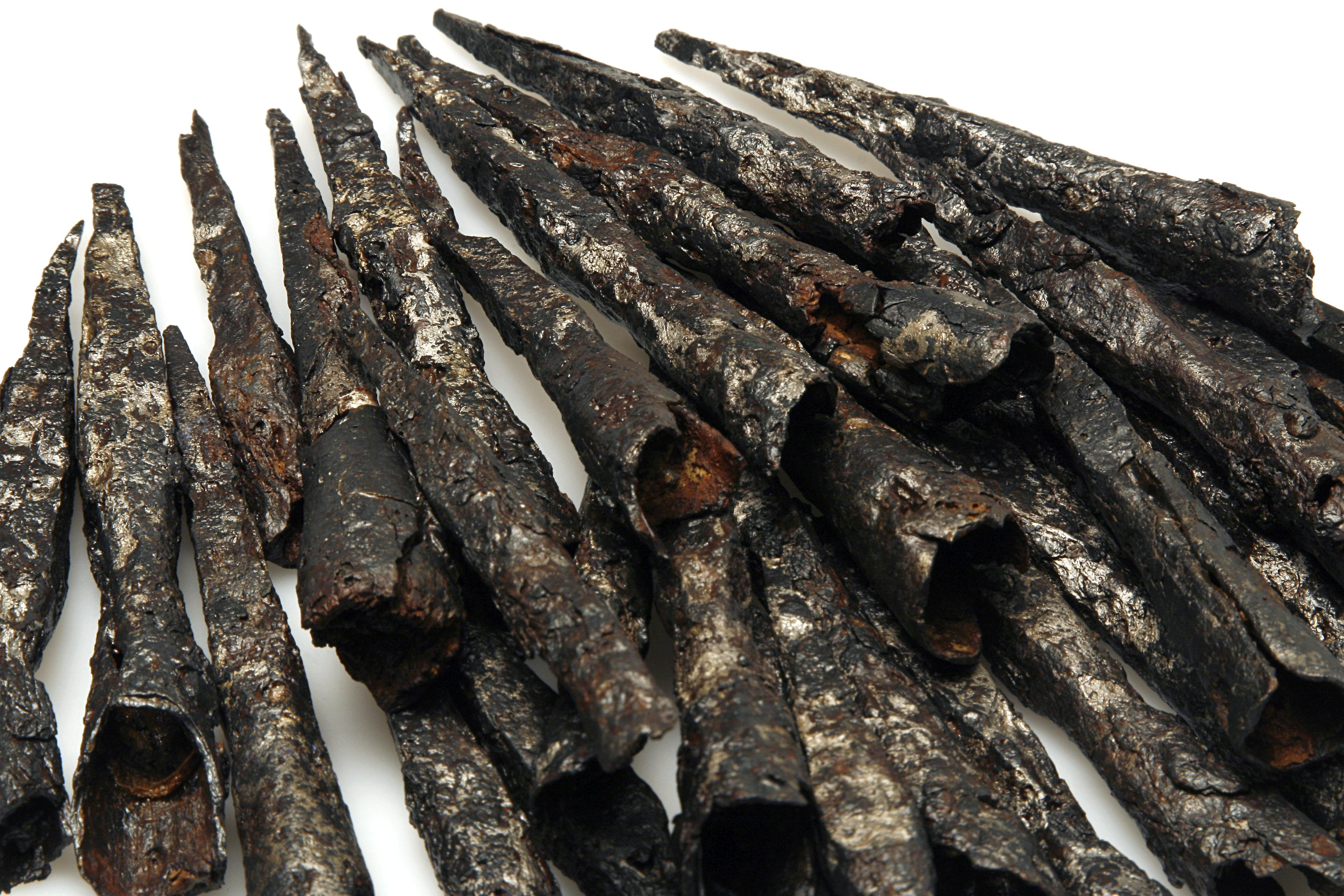
Ballista bolt heads

After the absorption of the Ancient Greek city-states into the Roman Republic in 146 BC, the highly advanced Greek technology began to spread across many areas of Roman influence. This included the great military machine advances the Greeks had made (most notably by Dionysus of Syracuse), as well as all the scientific, mathematical, political, and artistic developments.

The Romans adopted the torsion-powered ballista, which had by now spread to several cities around the Mediterranean, all of which became Roman spoils of war, including one from Pergamon, which was depicted among a pile of trophy weapons in relief on a balustrade.

The torsion ballista, developed by Alexander, was a far more complicated weapon than its predecessor, and the Romans developed it even further, especially into much smaller versions that could be easily carried.

=== Early Roman ballistae ===
The early Roman ballistae were made of wood and metal, and held together with iron plates around the frames and iron nails in the stand. The main stand had a slider on the top, into which were loaded the bolts or stone shot. Attached to this, at the back, was a pair of 'winches' and a 'claw,' used to ratchet the bowstring back to the armed firing position.

The slider passed through the field frames of the weapon, in which were located the torsion springs (rope made of animal sinew), which were twisted around the bow arms, which in turn were attached to the bowstring.

Drawing the bowstring back with the winches twisted the already taut springs, storing the energy to fire the projectiles. The bronze or iron caps, which secured the torsion bundles, were adjustable by means of pins and peripheral holes, which allowed the weapon to be tuned for symmetrical power and for changing weather conditions.

The ballista was a highly accurate weapon (there are many accounts of single soldiers being picked off by ballistarii), but some design aspects meant it could compromise its accuracy for range. The maximum range was over 500 yards (460 m), but the effective combat range for many targets was far shorter.

The Romans continued the development of the ballista, and it became a highly prized and valued weapon in the army of the Roman Empire.

It was used, just before the start of the Empire, by Julius Caesar during his conquest of Gaul and on both of his campaigns in subduing Britain.

==== First invasion of Britain ====
The first of Caesar's invasions of Britain took place in 55 BC, after a rapid and successful initial conquest of Gaul, in part as an expedition and more practically to try to put an end to the reinforcements sent by the native Britons to fight the Romans in Gaul.

A total of eighty means of transport, carrying two legions, attempted to land on the British shore, only to be driven back by the many British warriors assembled along the shoreline. The ships had to unload their troops on the beach, as it was the only one suitable for many miles, yet the massed ranks of British charioteers and javeliners were making it difficult.

Seeing this, Caesar ordered the warships – which were swifter and easier to handle than the transports, and likely to impress the natives more by their unfamiliar appearance – to be removed a short distance from the others, and then be rowed hard and run ashore on the enemy's right flank, from which position men on deck could use the slings, bows, and artillery to drive them back. This maneuver was highly successful.
Scared by the strange shape of the warships, the motion of the oars, and the unfamiliar machines, the natives halted and retreated. (Caesar, The Conquest of Gaul, p.99)

==== Siege of Alesia ====
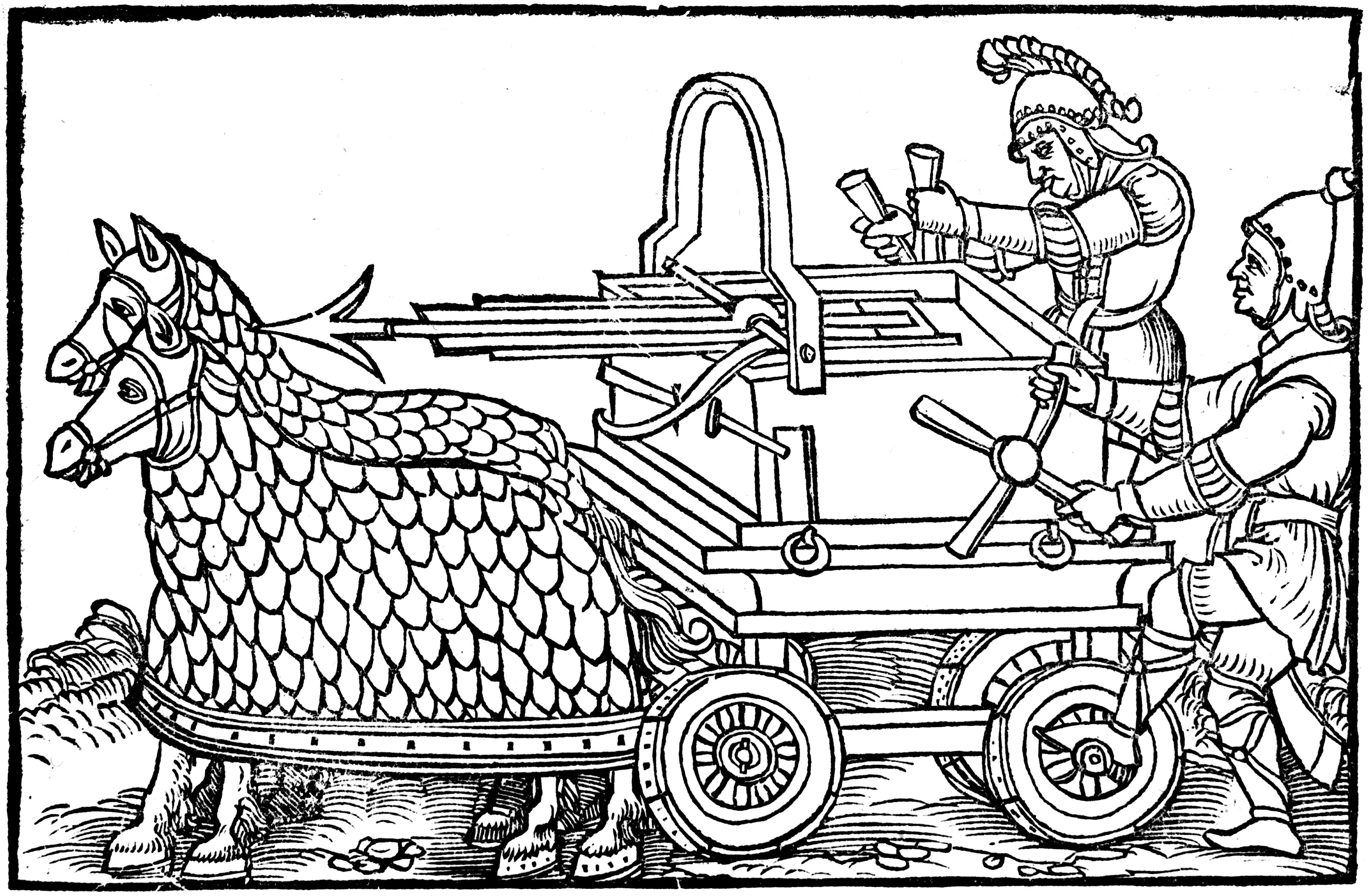
A four-wheeled carroballista drawn by armored horses, from an engraving illustrating a 1552 edition of the war-machine catalog De Rebus Bellicis (c. 400)

In Gaul, the stronghold of Alesia was under a Roman siege in 52 BC and was completely surrounded by a Roman fortification, including a wooden palisade and towers. As was a standard siege technique at the time, small ballistae were placed in the towers with other troops armed with bows or slings. The use of the ballista in the Roman siege strategy was also demonstrated in the case of the Siege of Masada.

=== Ballistae in the Roman Empire ===
During the conquest of the Empire, the ballista proved its worth many times in sieges and battles, both at sea and on land. It is from the time of the Roman Empire that many of the archaeological finds of ballistae date. Accounts by the finders, including technical manuals and journals, are used today by archaeologists to reconstruct these weapons.

After Julius Caesar, the ballista was a permanent fixture in the Roman army, and, over time, modifications and improvements were made by successive engineers. This included replacing the remaining wooden parts of the machine with metal, creating a much smaller, lighter and more powerful machine than the wooden version, which required less maintenance (though the vital torsion springs were still vulnerable to the strain). The largest ballistae of the 4th century could throw a dart further than 1,200 yards (1,100 m). The weapon was named ballista fulminalis in De rebus bellicis: "From this ballista, darts were projected not only in great number but also at a large size over a considerable distance, such as across the width of the Danube River." Ballistae were not only used in laying siege: after AD 350, at least 22 semi-circular towers were erected around the walls of Londinium (London) to provide platforms for permanently mounted defensive devices.

=== Eastern Roman Empire ===
During the 6th century, Procopius described the effects of this weapon:

But Belisarius placed upon the towers engines which they call "ballistae". Now these engines have the form of a bow, but on the under side of them a grooved wooden shaft projects; this shaft is so fitted to the bow that it is free to move, and rests upon a straight iron bed. So when men wish to shoot at the enemy with this, they make the parts of the bow which form the ends bend toward one another by means of a short rope fastened to them, and they place in the grooved shaft the arrow, which is about one half the length of the ordinary missiles which they shoot from bows, but about four times as wide...but the missile is discharged from the shaft, and with such force that it attains the distance of not less than two bow-shots, and that, when it hits a tree or a rock, it pierces it easily. Such is the engine which bears this name, being so called because it shoots with very great force...

The missiles were able to penetrate body-armour:

And at the Salarian Gate a Goth of goodly stature and a capable warrior, wearing a corselet and having a helmet on his head, a man who was of no mean station in the Gothic nation, refused to remain in the ranks with his comrades, but stood by a tree and kept shooting many missiles at the parapet. But this man by some chance was hit by a missile from an engine which was on a tower at his left. And passing through the corselet and the body of the man, the missile sank more than half its length into the tree, and pinning him to the spot where it entered the tree, it suspended him there a corpse.

==== Carroballista ====
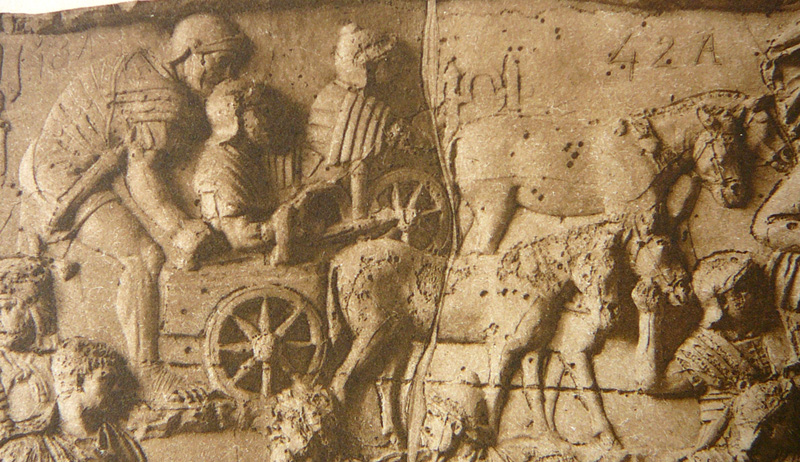
Roman cart-mounted carroballista

The carroballista was a cart-mounted version of the weapon. There were probably different models of ballista under the cheiroballistra class, at least two different two-wheeled models and one model with four wheels. Their probable size was roughly 1.47 m (4 ft 10 in) width, i.e., 5 Roman feet. The cart system and structure gave it a great deal of flexibility and capability as a battlefield weapon, since the increased maneuverability allowed it to be moved with the flow of the battle. This weapon is featured several times on Trajan's Column.

==== Polybolos ====
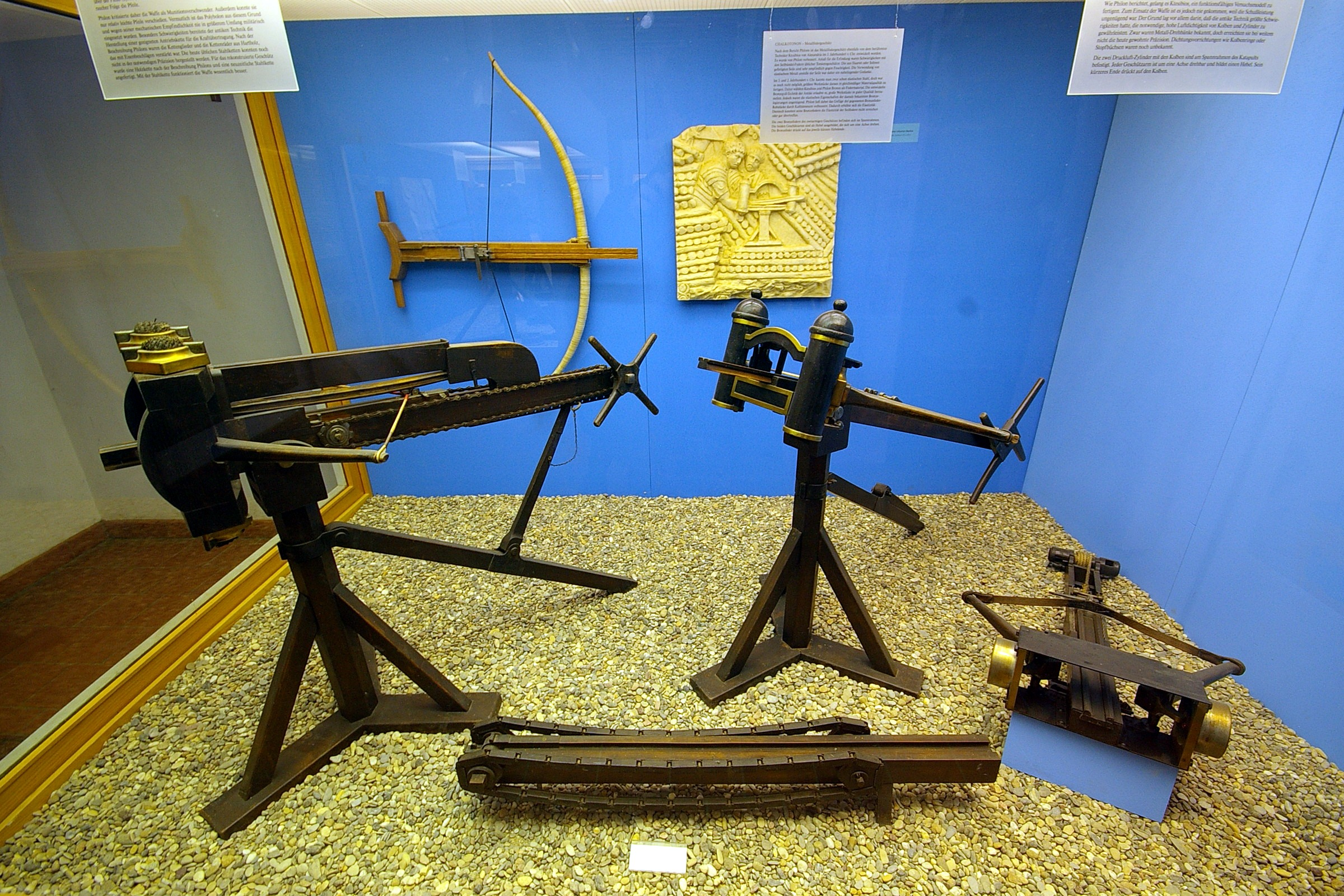
Reproductions of ancient Greek artillery, including catapults such as the polybolos (to the left in the foreground) and a large, early crossbow known as the gastraphetes (mounted on the wall in the background)

It has been speculated that the Roman military may have also fielded a 'repeating' ballista, also known as a polybolos. Reconstruction and trials of such a weapon carried out in a BBC documentary, What the Romans Did For Us, showed that they "were able to shoot eleven bolts a minute, which is almost four times the rate at which an ordinary ballista can be operated". However, no example of such a weapon has been found by archaeologists.

==== Cheiroballistra and manuballista ====
The cheiroballistra and the manuballista are held by many scholars to be the same weapon. The difference in name may be attributable to the different languages spoken in the Empire. Latin remained the official language in the Western Empire, but the Eastern Empire predominantly used Greek, which added an extra 'r' to the word ballista.

The manuballista was a handheld version of the traditional ballista. This new version was made entirely of iron, which conferred greater power to the weapon since it was smaller and less iron (an expensive material before the 19th century), was used in its production. It was not the ancient gastraphetes but the Roman weapon. However, the same physical limitations applied as with the gastraphetes.

=== Archaeology and the Roman ballista ===
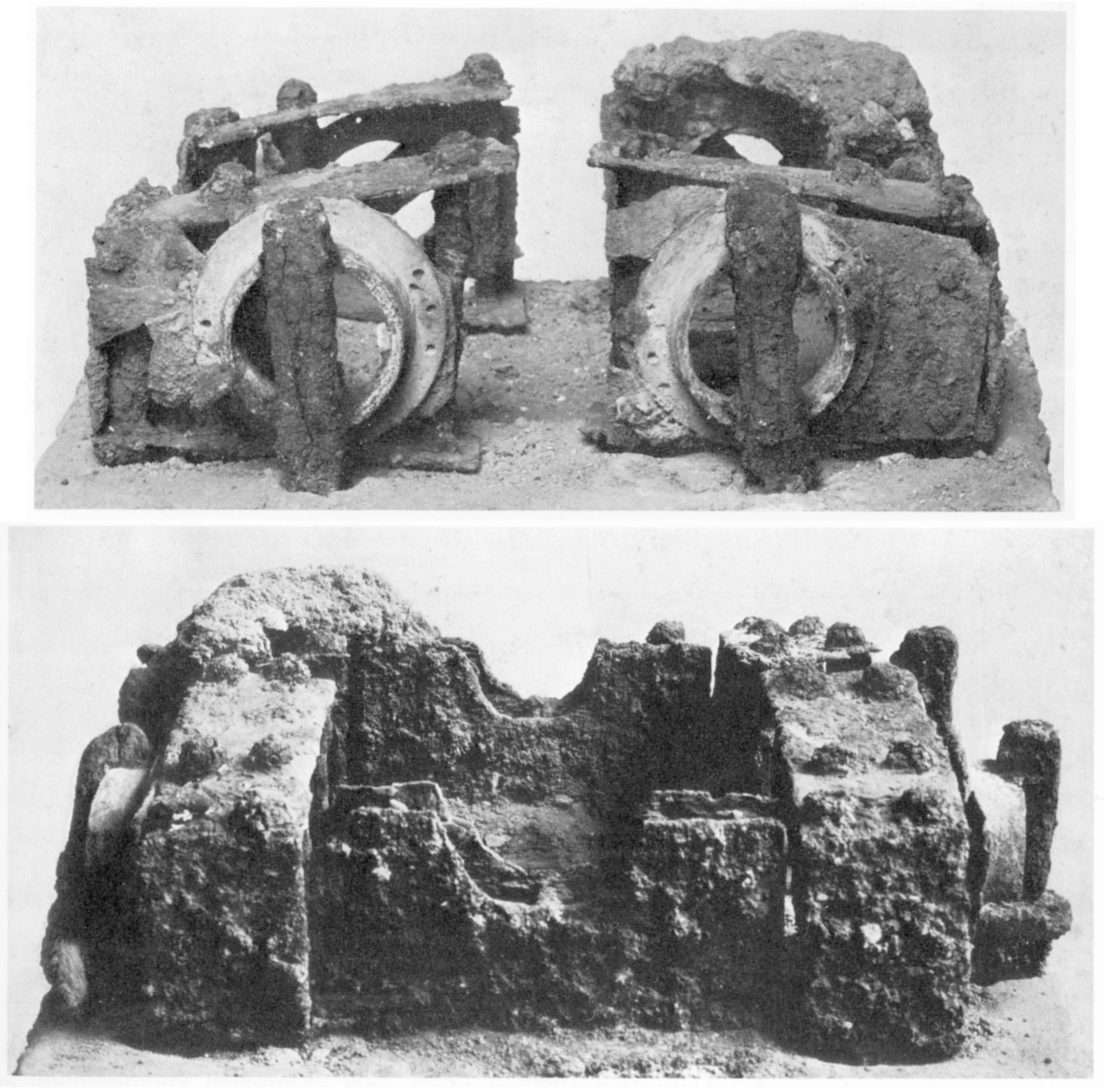
Metal components of the Ampurias Catapult, found in 1912 in the Neapolis of Ampurias

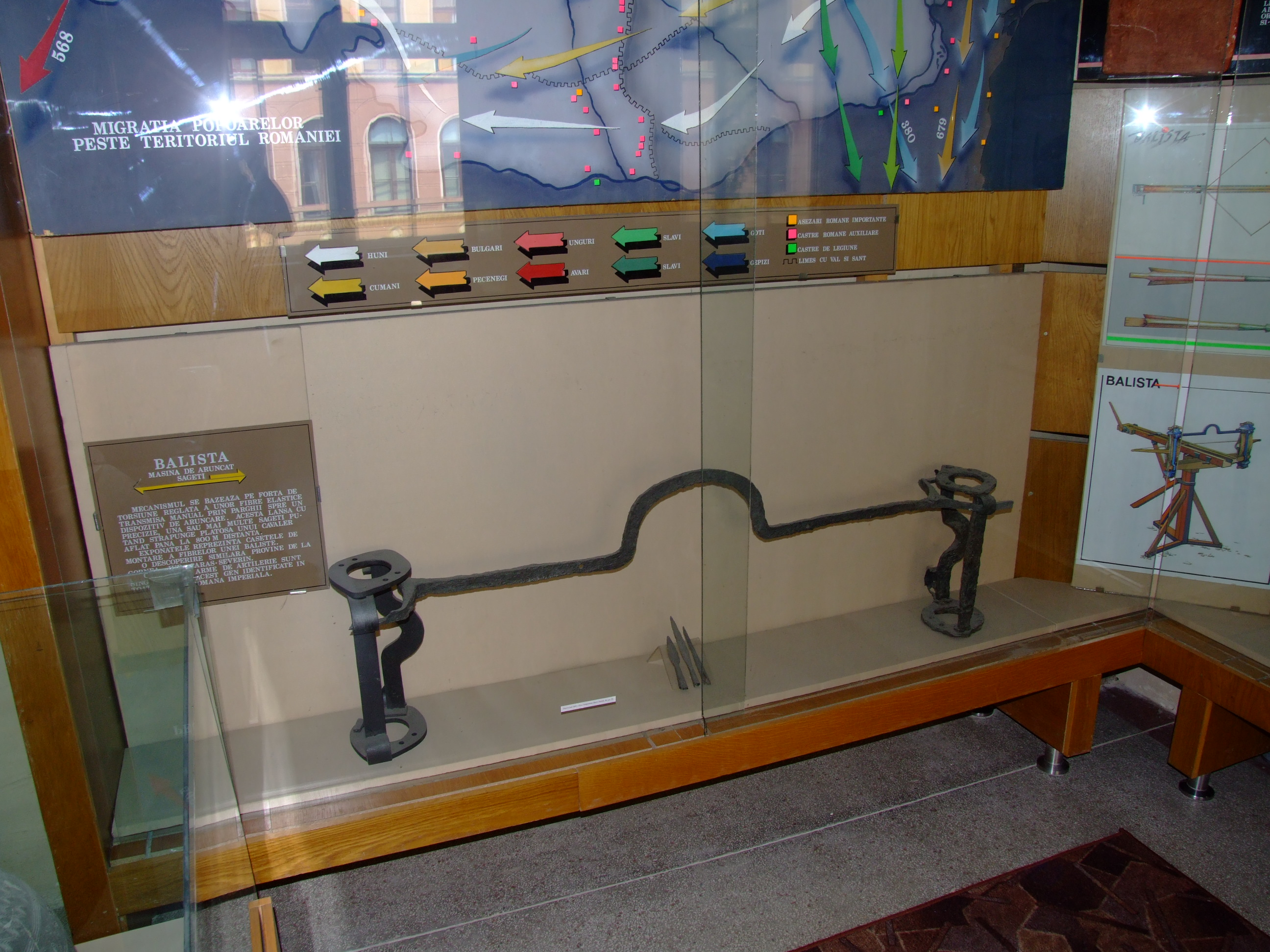
Metal components of a 4th-century ballista

Archaeology, and in particular experimental archaeology, has been influential on this subject. Although several ancient authors (such as Vegetius) wrote very detailed technical treatises, providing us with all the information necessary to reconstruct the weapons, all their measurements were in their native language and therefore highly difficult to translate.

Attempts to reconstruct these ancient weapons began at the end of the 19th century, based on rough translations of ancient authors. It was only during the 20th century, however, that many of the reconstructions began to make any sense as a weapon. By bringing in modern engineers, progress was made with the ancient systems of measurement. By redesigning the reconstructions using the new information, archaeologists in that specialty were able to recognise certain finds from Roman military sites, and identify them as ballistae. The information gained from the excavations was fed into the next generation of reconstructions and so on.

Sites across the empire have yielded information on ballistae, from Spain (the Ampurias Catapult) to Italy (the Cremona Battleshield, which proved that the weapons had decorative metal plates to shield the operators) to Iraq (the Hatra Machine) and even Scotland (Burnswark siege tactics training camp), and many other sites between.

The most influential archaeologists in this area have been Peter Connolly and Eric Marsden, who have not only written extensively on the subject but have also made many reconstructions themselves and have refined the designs over many years of work.

== Middle Ages ==
With the decline of the Roman Empire, resources to build and maintain these complex machines became very scarce, so the ballista was likely supplanted initially by the simpler and cheaper onager and the more efficient springald.

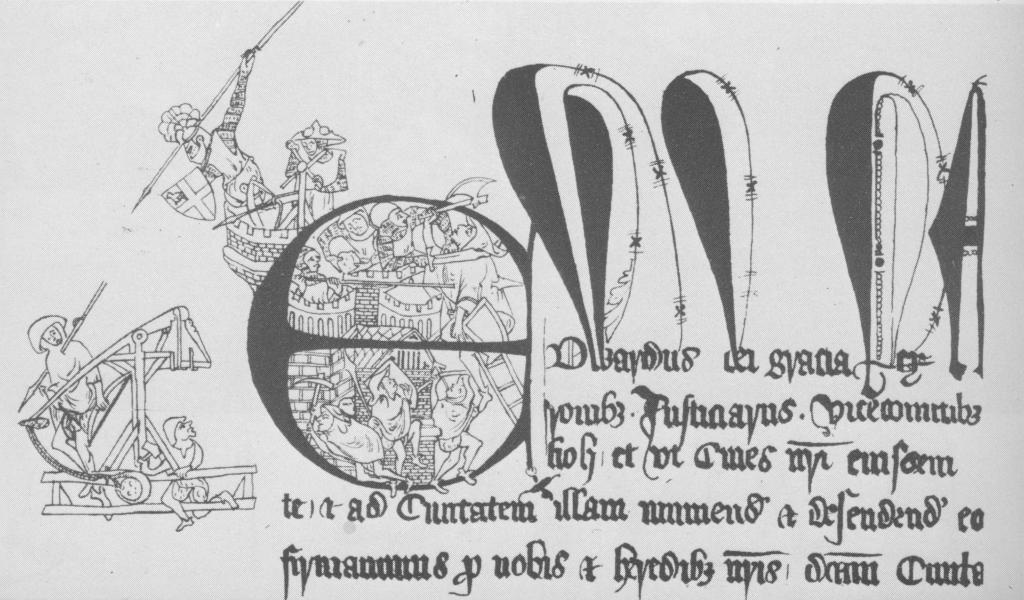
Detail from Royal charter awarded to Carlisle, showing the operation of a ballista (in the tower) by the city's garrison.

However, while it remained less and less popular as more efficient siege engines such as the trebuchet and the mangonel became widespread, the Ballista still retained some use in Medieval Siege Warfare, especially by city and castle garrisons, until it was finally extinguished by the more convenient medieval cannons, already omnipresent in all major European Catholic cities by the first half of the 14th century.

The Littere Wallie records the existence of 4 "balistas ad turrimi" at "Duluithelan" [Dolwyddelan] Castle in 1280, one "balistam de tur" at "Rothelano"[Rhuddlan] castle and one "magnam ballistam" at "Bere Blada" Castle [Castell y Bere?] in 1286. These all being held under the authority of the English Crown.

In more remote regions such as Ireland, where cannons were rare and personal firearms were almost non-existent, ballistae had recorded use well into the late 15th century.

While not a direct descendant mechanically, the concept and naming continue on as arbalest crossbows (arcus 'bow' + ballista).

== See also ==
- Harpax
- Roman infantry tactics
- Roman military personal equipment
- Roman siege engines
