= De rebus bellicis =

Anonymous work of the 4th or 5th century

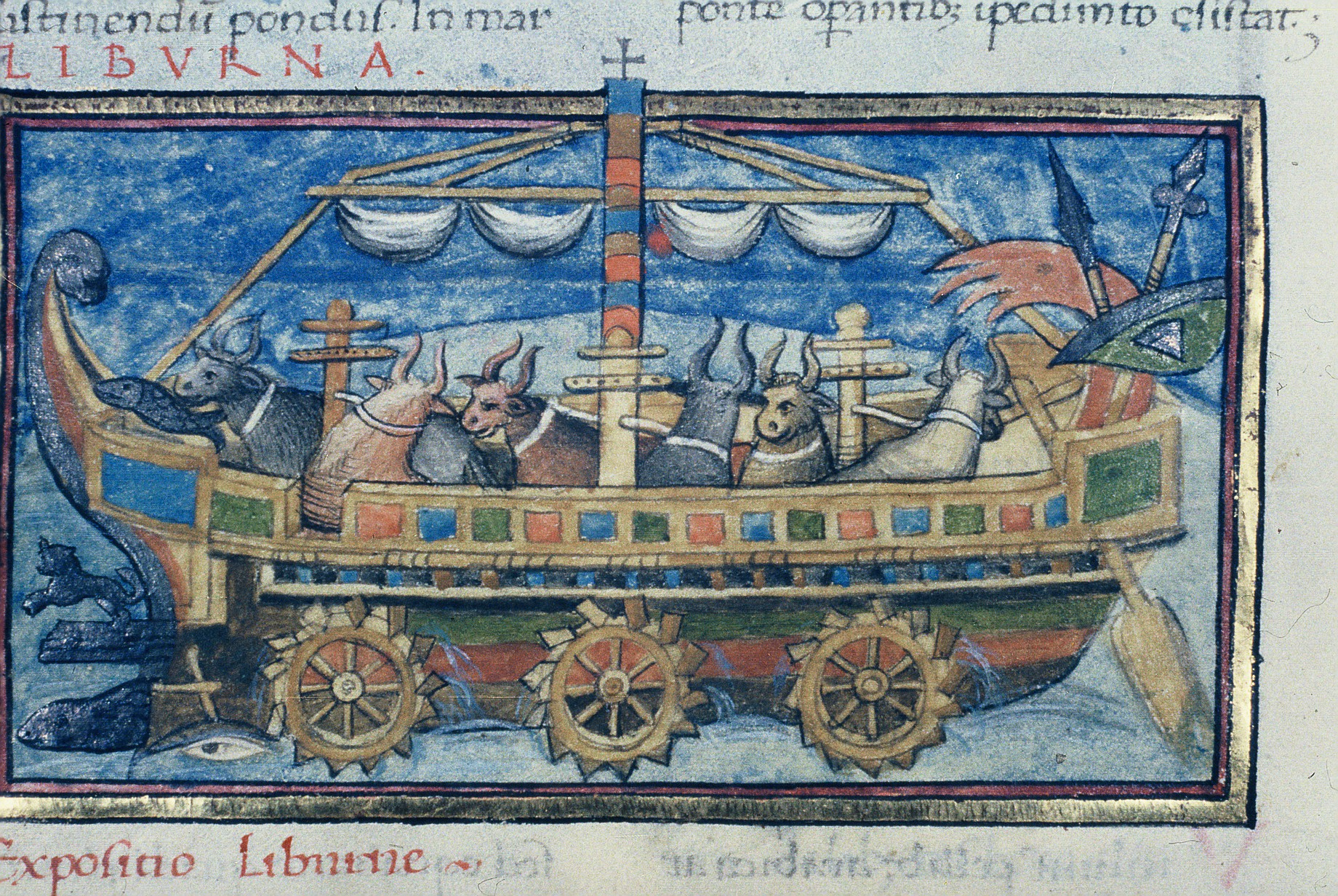
Ox-powered Roman paddle-wheel boat from a 15th-century copy of De Rebus Bellicis

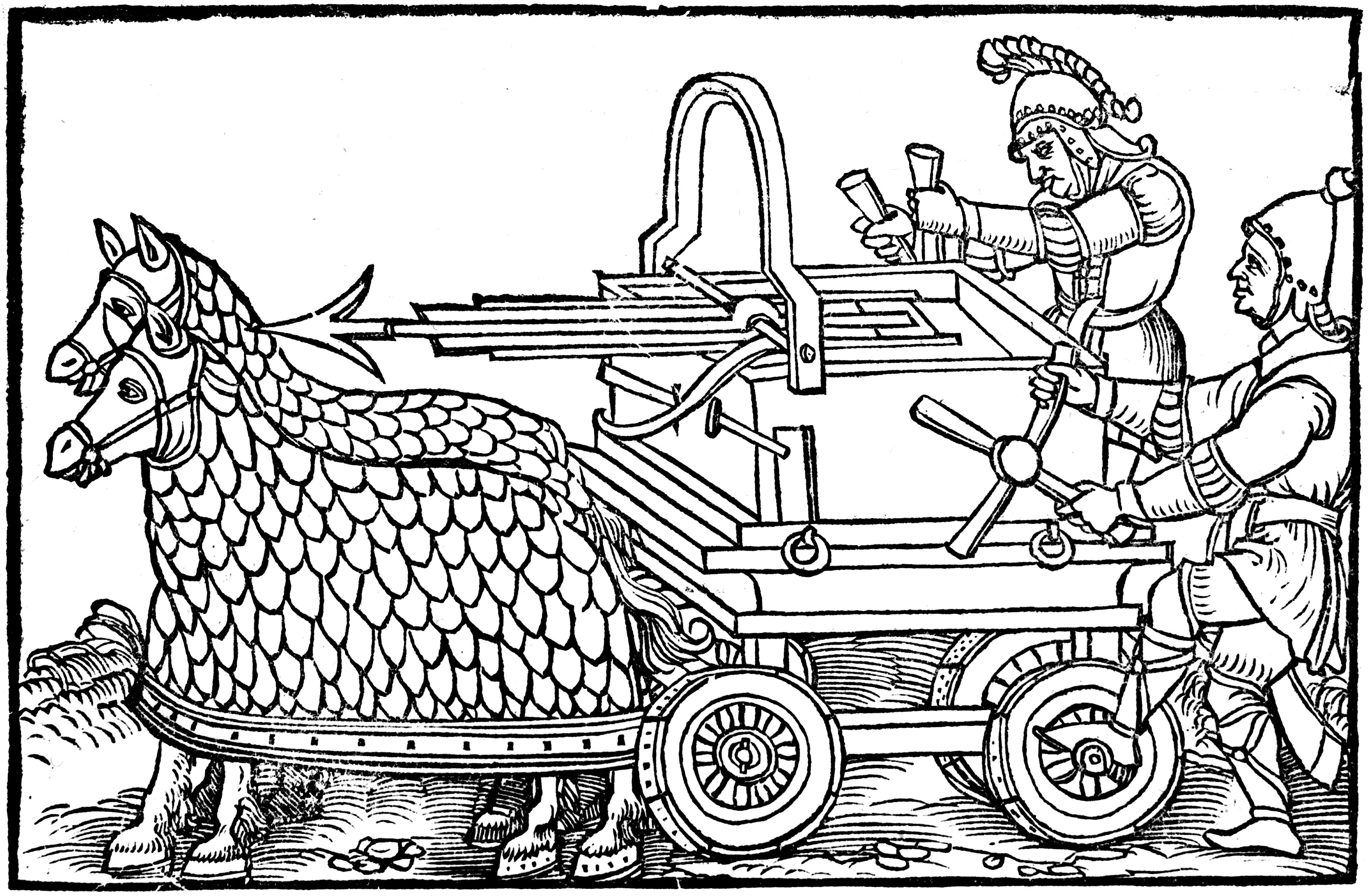
A four-wheeled ballista drawn by armored horses, from an engraving illustrating the 1552 editio princeps of De Rebus Bellicis

De rebus bellicis ("On the Things of Wars") is an anonymous work of the 4th or 5th century which suggests remedies for the military and financial problems in the Roman Empire, including a number of fanciful war machines. It was written after the death of Constantine I in 337 (it is explicitly stated that Constantine was dead when the work was written) and before the fall of the Western Roman Empire in 476. Some researchers suggest that it may refer to the Battle of Adrianople of 378 (it refers to the serious threat posed by the barbarian tribes to the empire), or even the death of Emperor Theodosius I in 395, as it uses the plural form of the word "princeps", the title of the emperor, which may refer to the split of the Empire between Honorius and Arcadius after the death of Theodosius.

== Editions ==
- Anonymi Auctoris De Rebus Bellicis. recensvit Robert I. Ireland (Bibliotheca scriptorvm Graecorvm et Romanorvm Tevbneriana), Lipsiae, 1984.
- "Anónimo Sobre Asuntos Militares", Edited, trans. and comm. by Álvaro Sánchez–Ostiz (EUNSA), Pamplona, 2004.
- "Le cose della guerra", Introduction, Text, Translation and Commentary by Andrea Giardina, Fondazione Lorenzo Valla, Arnoldo Mondadori 1989.
