= Aza Arnold =

American inventor and machinist (1788–1865)

- Born: October 4, 1788; Smithfield, Rhode Island, US
- Died: 1865 (aged 76–77); Washington, D.C., US
- Occupations: Machinist; millowner; patent attorney
- Spouse: Abigail Dennis
- Children: 9

Aza Arnold (October 4, 1788 – 1865) was an American machinist, inventor, millowner, and patent attorney. Born in Smithfield, Rhode Island, he was trained as a machinist during his youth, and in 1809, entered work at Samuel Slater's textile manufacturing equipment plant in Pawtucket. After a failed venture in woolen blanket production and several years of employment at another Pawtucket factory, he invented a device to separate wool during carding and began to experiment with differential gear trains, possibly inventing the device independently or borrowing the concept from contemporary clockmaking.

After building and operating a cotton mill in Great Falls, New Hampshire, he incorporated a differential gear train into a cotton roving frame, allowing the bobbins to progressively slow relative to the spindles, in turn producing higher-quality thread. He patented the gear train in 1823, but was unable to obtain redress for rampant patent infringements, with the technology rapidly spreading across the United States and Europe over the following years. After several years administering a manufacturing plant in North Providence, Rhode Island, he moved to Philadelphia to operate a print works. He moved to Washington, D.C., around 1850 and entered work as a patent attorney. He patented his final invention, a self-raking saw, in June 1856. He died in Washington in 1865, and was buried at a local Quaker cemetery.

== Career ==
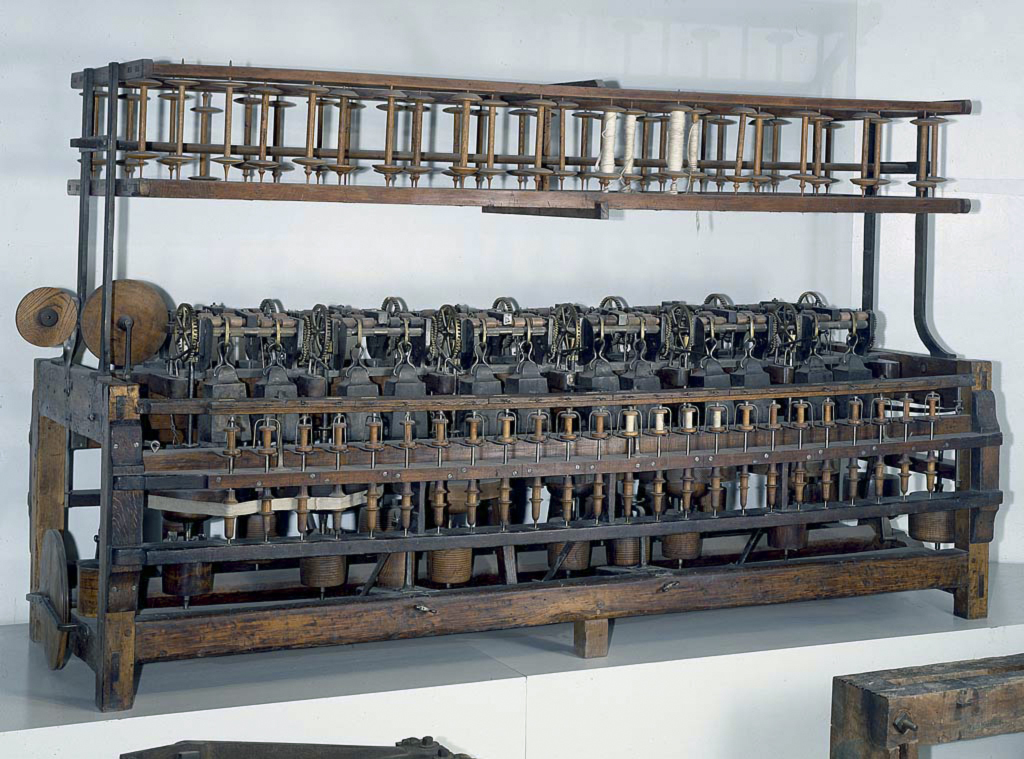
A roving frame built by Samuel Slater, 1790

Aza Arnold was born on October 4, 1788, in Smithfield, Rhode Island, (Note: Some sources give November 4.) to Benjamin Arnold and Isabel Arnold, née Green. His mother died when he was two years old. He attended school in Smithfield, but began work at a very young age. He initially trained as a carpenter, but later apprenticed as a machinist. Around 1809, he began work producing textile manufacturing equipment at Samuel Slater's plant in Pawtucket.

Arnold left employment at Slater's manufacturing plant to begin producing woolen blankets. However, this proved commercially unsuccessful. In 1812, he allegedly invented a file-cutting machine, but no patent documentation is available. Sometime after 1813, he began work at Larned Pitcher and P. Hovey's textile machinery plant in Pawtucket. While at Pitcher and Hovey's factory, he developed a device to separate wool into slivers during carding. However, it is unknown if he patented the device. He moved with his family to Great Falls, New Hampshire, in 1819, where he constructed and operated a cotton mill. Several years later, he moved to North Providence, Rhode Island, where he established his own textile machinery plant. By 1830, he had partnered with manufacturer Samuel Greene.

=== Differential gear ===
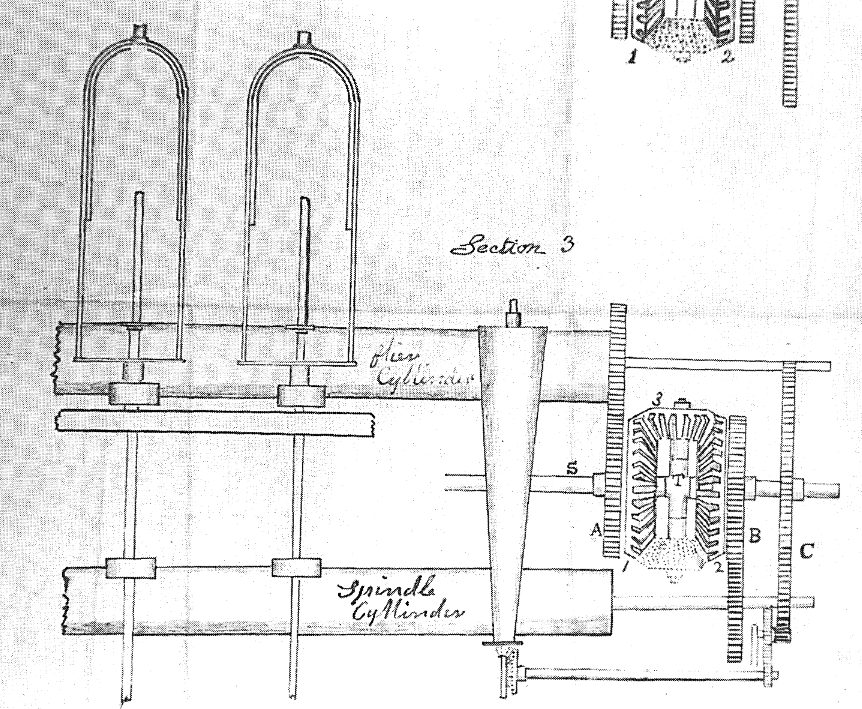
Patent diagram of Arnold's differential drive train for cotton roving, dated January 21, 1823

In 1818, Arnold invented a differential gear. Around two years later, while repairing a cotton roving frame, he began to realize the differential's potential application for cotton roving. In 1822, he incorporated the differential into a roving frame, allowing the bobbins to progressively slow relative to the spindles as it filled. This produced high-quality thread which was more flexible and less prone to breaking. This gear train system was considered impressive by regional engineers, who had initially described the proposal as "impracticable". Although initially invented in ancient times (attested in the Chinese south-pointing chariot and the Ancient Greek Antikythera mechanism), the first modern differential gears were used by some 18th-century clockmakers, with James White pioneering its first industrial usage in the 1780s in order to adjust the gap between windmill millstones in variable winds. It is unknown if either Arnold or White were aware of antecedents to their differentials in clockmaking.

Arnold filed a patent for the device, dated January 21, 1823. Despite the patent, it was almost immediately plagiarized by the Lowell mill corporations. It spread across other cotton manufacturing plants, initially limited to New England. By 1825, it had been introduced to England, where a manufacturer named Houldsworth patented it. Following this, it became known as "Houldsworth's differential" in the United Kingdom. It was in use in Mulhouse, France, by the end of the 1820s.

Even within the United States, many manufacturers refused to pay royalty fees for the differential gear train. Arnold filed various patent infringement suits but was unable to obtain redress. He sued the Proprietors of Locks and Canals, manufacturers of Lowell corporate machines, for $30,000. Lowell-associated corporate agents, attempting to defend against patent infringement suits, were unable to find precedence to differential gears' usage in cotton processing in the United Kingdom. Corporate pressure contributed to the Patent Act of 1836, and Arnold was rendered unable to extend his patent on the differential. He eventually received $3,500 in compensation.

=== Later career ===
Arnold moved to Philadelphia in the 1840s (Note: The Dictionary of American Biography erroneously reported Arnold's move to Philadelphia as occurring in 1838.) and began work as an operator for the Mulhausen Print Works. Around 1850, he moved to Washington, D.C., and entered work as a patent attorney. His last invention, a "self-setting and self-raking saw for sawing machines", was patented in June 1856.

== Personal life and death ==
Arnold married Abigail Dennis on July 28, 1815, and with her had nine children. He was a Quaker. Politically conservative, he strongly opposed Thomas Wilson Dorr during the Dorr Rebellion, describing the Dorrites as "a company [raised] at New York of the liberated convicts, bartenders & radicals." Arnold died in Washington, D.C., in 1865, and was buried there at the Old Friends' Cemetery.
