= Onésiphore =

Onésiphore is a French masculine given name. Notable people with the given name include:

- Onésiphore Carbonneau (1852–1932), Canadian politician
- Onésiphore Ernest Talbot (1854–1934), Canadian politician
- Onésiphore Turgeon (1849–1944), Canadian politician
- Onésiphore Pecqueur (1792–1852), French mechanical engineer
- Édouard-Onésiphore Martin (1841–1889), Canadian politician
