= Luigi Torchi =

Luigi Torchi may refer to:

- Luigi Torchi (inventor)
- Luigi Torchi (musician)
