= Ma Jun (mechanical engineer) =

Chinese practical man (floruit 200–265)

Ma Jun 馬鈞
- Born: Unknown; Xingping, Shaanxi
- Died: Unknown
- Other name: Deheng (徳衡)
- Occupations: Practical inventor, politician

Ma Jun
- Traditional Chinese: 馬鈞
- Simplified Chinese: 马钧
Transcriptions
Standard Mandarin
- Hanyu Pinyin: Mǎ Jūn
- Wade–Giles: Ma3 Chün1

Ma Jun (fl. 200–265), courtesy name Deheng, was a Chinese practical man, inventor, and politician who lived in the state of Cao Wei during the Three Kingdoms period of China. His most notable invention was that of the south-pointing chariot, a directional compass vehicle which actually had no magnetic function, but was operated by use of differential gears (which applies equal amount of torque to driving wheels rotating at different speeds). It is because of this revolutionary device (and other achievements) that Ma Jun is known as one of the most brilliant mechanical engineers and inventors of his day (alongside Zhang Heng of the earlier Eastern Han dynasty). The device was re-invented by many after Ma Jun, including the astronomer and mathematician Zu Chongzhi (429–500). In the later medieval dynastic periods, Ma Jun's south-pointing chariot was combined in a single device with the distance-measuring odometer.

== Life ==
According to his friend and contemporary poet and philosopher Fu Xuan (217–278), Ma Jun was born in Fufeng Commandery (扶風郡), which is located around present-day Xingping, Shaanxi. (Note: Fu Xuan also wrote a biography for Ma Jun, which was included by Pei Songzhi as an annotation to Du Kui's biography in Sanguozhi.) In his youth, Ma Jun travelled throughout present-day Henan and obtained the position of a boshi (博士; a minor literary degree). Despite this degree, Ma Jun was relatively poor in his youth, yet found means to gain recognition by employing his natural genius in creating mechanical contraptions and inventions.

Ma Jun was a somewhat distinguished official serving under the state of Cao Wei, becoming an Official Who Concurrently Serves in the Palace (給事中). Ma Jun once oversaw the construction of Chonghua Palace (崇華殿) under the orders of Cao Rui, the second Wei emperor. Ma Jun was very well known in Wei as a very gifted designer of weapons and certain types of devices, and was praised especially by Fu Xuan in an essay of his. Fu Xuan noted that Ma Jun was not the best orator or master of rhetorics, and had trouble conveying his ideas to others with his somewhat introverted personality. Nonetheless, he gained fame for his mechanical genius, and is universally considered one of the greatest mechanical engineers of ancient China.

== Engineering and technological achievements ==
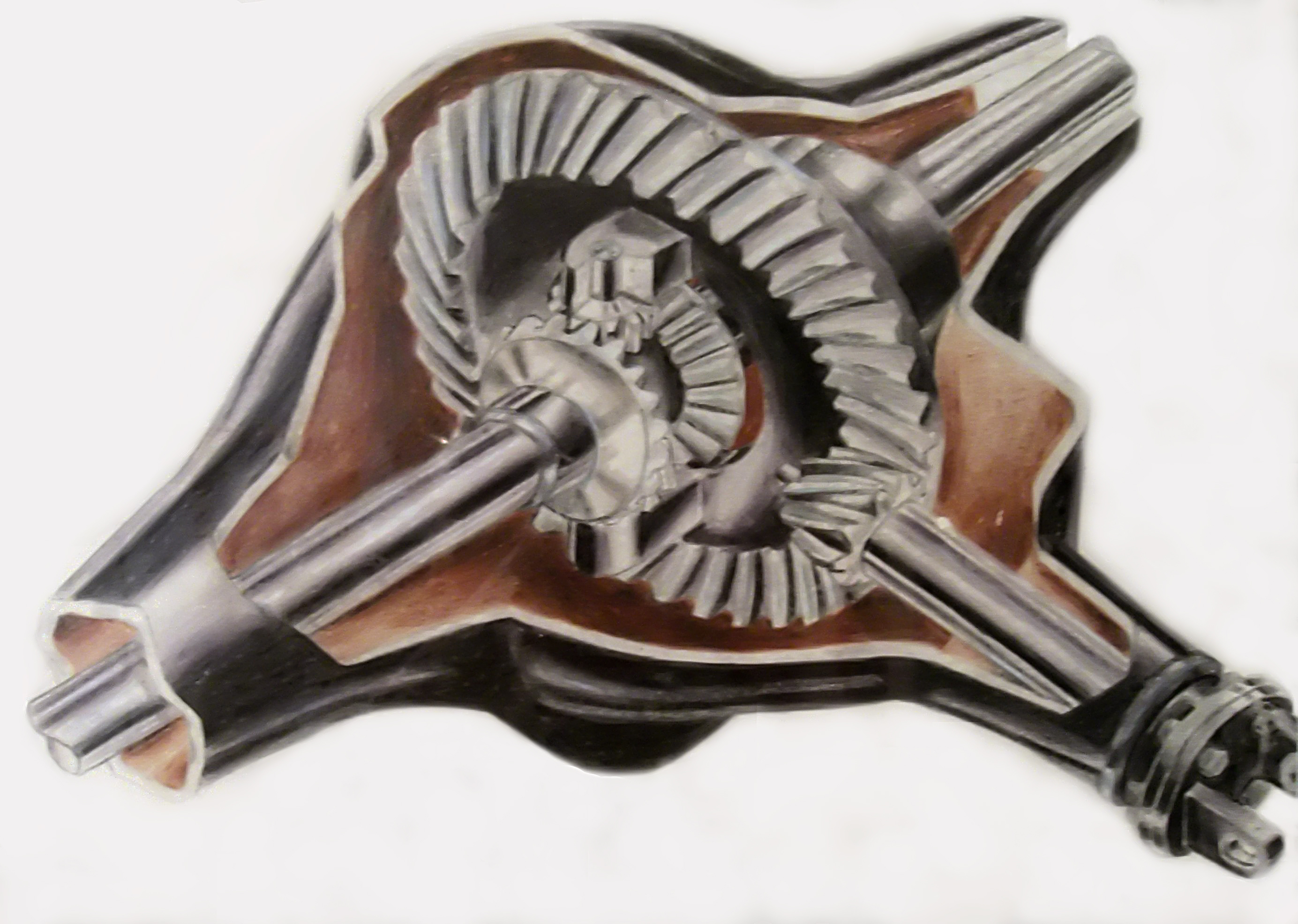
An illustration of a differential between the drive shaft and rear wheels of a modern automobile.

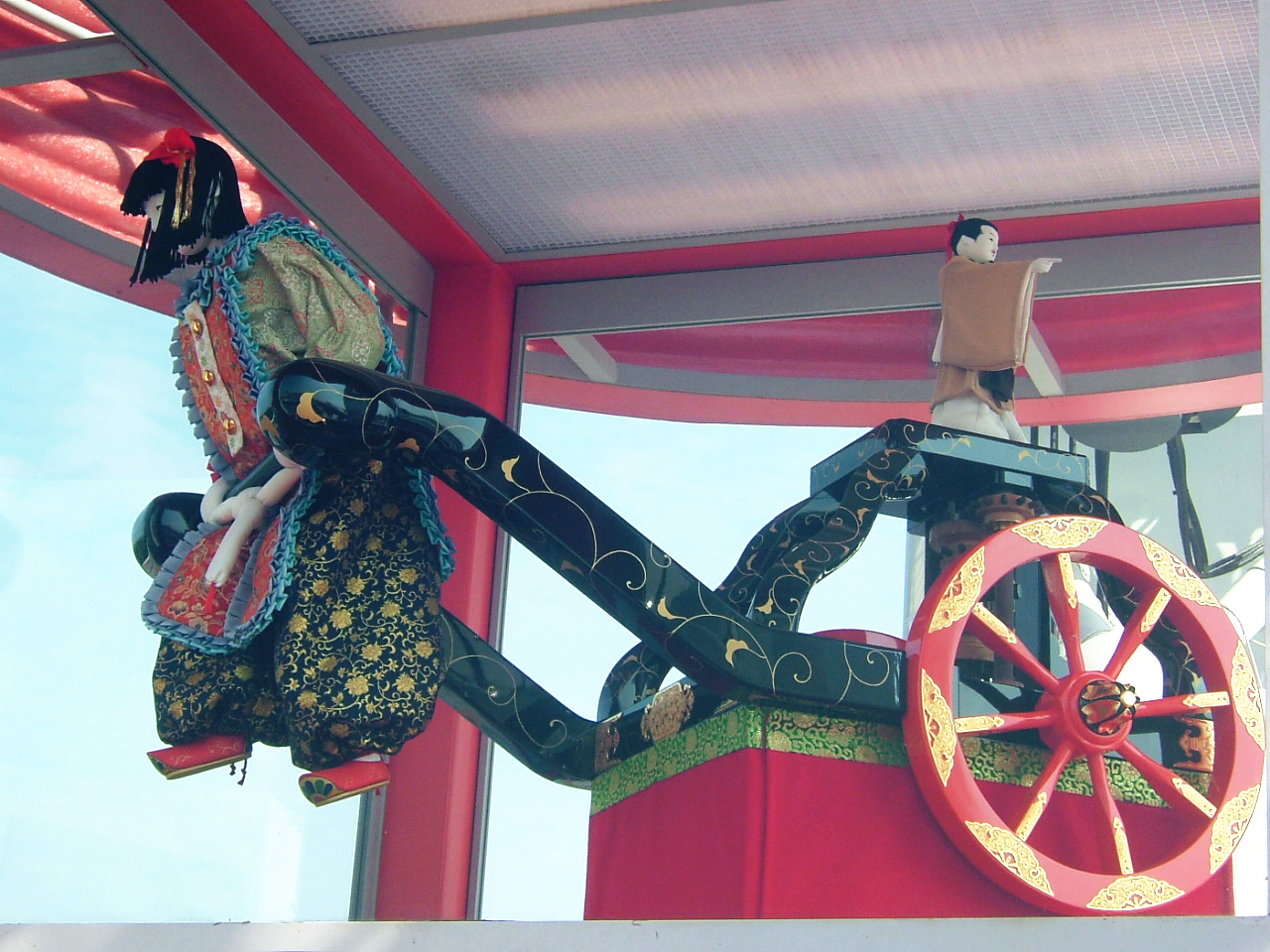
Replica of a south-pointing chariot, 2005

One of Ma Jun's early inventions was an improved silk drawloom, which, according to Fu Xuan, earned Ma Jun considerable recognition for his innovative skill. In his time, silk looms generally had fifty heddles and fifty treadles, some even up to sixty of each. Ma Jun crafted a loom that had only twelve treadles, which not only made the process faster and more efficient, but also allowed the weaving of new intricate patterns.

While serving in the Wei government, Ma Jun got into a dispute with Gaotang Long (高唐隆) and Qin Lang over the concept of the south-pointing carriage, or the south-pointing chariot. Gaotang Long and Qin Lang mocked Ma Jun for his belief in historical texts that the south-pointing chariot had actually been invented in the past (as the legend goes, by the Yellow Emperor), something they viewed as nonsensical, non-historical myth. Ma Jun retorted, "Empty arguments with words cannot (in any way) compare with a test which will show practical results". After being instructed to craft such a device, Ma Jun completed his fully functional design of the south-pointing chariot in the year 235. With this mechanical-driven compass-vehicle device, Ma Jun created one of the first mechanical devices in the world to employ differential gear designs. Referring to history of differential gears, Ma Jun's differential gear is the earliest historically verifiable design. In China, the south-pointing chariot was re-invented a second time by Zu Chongzhi (429–500) due to the original detailed instructions being lost.

Ma Jun once invented for the Wei emperor Cao Rui an intricate hydraulic-powered, mechanical-operated puppet theatre (much more complex than the mechanical puppet set discovered by Liu Bang (Emperor Gao), the founding emperor of the Han dynasty, when he observed the state-absorbed items taken from the treasury of Qin Shi Huang). His puppet theatre is similar to that of a Greek model invented by Heron of Alexandria, the difference being that the latter used instead a rotating cylindrical cogwheel with ropes and pulleys to operate his mechanical theatre. Joseph Needham describes Ma Jun's mechanical theatre in a passage taken from the Records of the Three Kingdoms:

Certain persons offered to the emperor a theatre of puppets, which could be set up in various scenes, but all motionless. The emperor asked whether they could be made to move, and Ma Jun said that they could. The emperor asked whether it could be possible to make the whole thing more ingenious, and again Ma Jun said yes, and accepted the command to do it. He took a large piece of wood and fashioned it into the shape of a wheel which rotated in a horizontal position by the power of unseen water. He furthermore arranged images of singing-girls which played music and danced, and when (a particular) puppet came upon the scene, other wooden men beat drums and blew upon flutes. Ma Jun also made a mountain with wooden images dancing on balls, throwing swords about, hanging upside down on rope ladders, and generally behaving in an assured and easy manner. Government officials were in their offices, pounding and grinding was going on, cocks were fighting, and all was continually changing and moving ingeniously with a hundred variations...

Possibly inspired by this incredible mechanical theatre of puppets, Qu Zhi of the Jin dynasty (266–420) made similar mechanical sets with wooden dolls. Joseph Needham states that he was famous for his "wooden dolls' house, with images which opened doors and bowed, and for his 'rats' market', which had figures which automatically closed the doors when the rats wanted to leave".

Ma Jun was also responsible for the construction of square-pallet chain pumps meant for irrigation. However, Ma Jun was not the first person in China to invent such a device. An earlier account was made in the year 80 by the philosopher Wang Chong in his Discourses Weighed in the Balance. The Eastern Han dynasty court eunuch Zhang Rang once ordered the engineer Bi Lan to construct a series of chain pumps outside the capital city of Luoyang, used for irrigation and means of fresh water source. Ma Jun constructed his square-pallet chain pumps to water newly designated garden space established within Luoyang by Cao Rui.

== See also ==
- Lists of people of the Three Kingdoms
- List of mechanical engineers
- History of science and technology in China
