= South-pointing chariot =

Chinese two-wheeled chariot

Chinese name
- Traditional Chinese: 指南車
- Simplified Chinese: 指南车
Transcriptions
Standard Mandarin
- Hanyu Pinyin: zhǐ nán chē
Yue: Cantonese
- Yale Romanization: jí nàahm guī
- Jyutping: zi2 naam4 gui1

Vietnamese name
- Vietnamese alphabet: xe chỉ nam chỉ nam xa
- Hán-Nôm: 車指南 指南車

Korean name
- Hangul: 지남차
- Hanja: 指南車
Transcriptions
- Revised Romanization: jinamcha

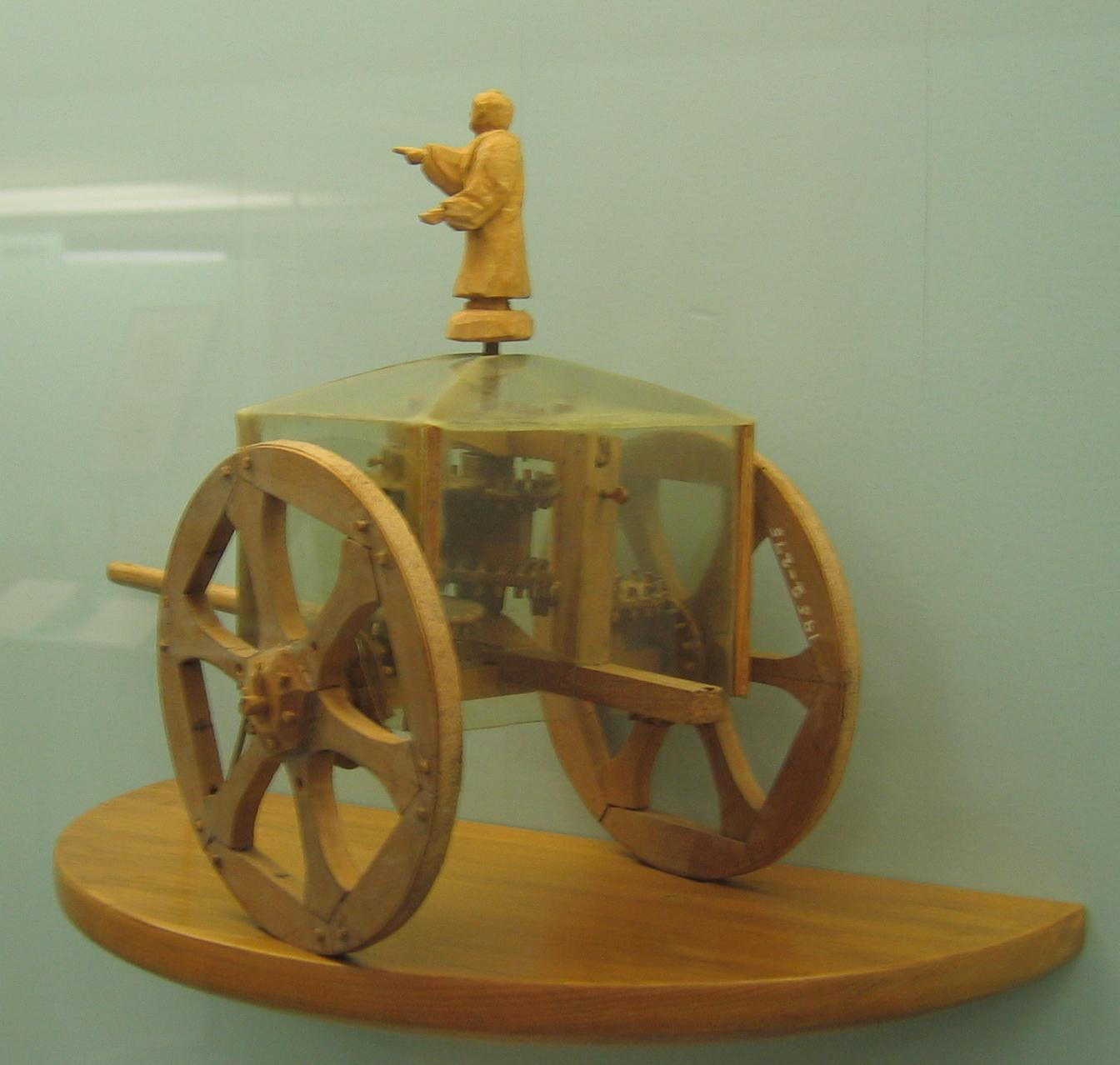
Exhibit in the Science Museum in London, England. This conjectural model chariot incorporates a differential gear.

The south-pointing chariot (or carriage) was an ancient Chinese two-wheeled vehicle that carried a movable pointer that indicated south, no matter how the chariot turned. Usually, the pointer took the form of a doll or figure with an outstretched arm. The chariot was supposedly used as a non-magnetic compass for navigation and may also have had other purposes.

The ancient Chinese invented a mobile-like armored cart in the 5th century BC called the Dongwu Che (Chinese: 洞屋车). It was used for the purpose of protecting warriors on the battlefield, as a kind of mobile protective cart with a shed-like roof. It would be rolled up to city walls to provide protection for sappers digging underneath to weaken its foundation. The early Chinese war wagon became the basis of ancient Chinese south-pointing chariots.

There are legends of earlier south-pointing chariots, but the first reliably documented one was created by the Chinese mechanical engineer Ma Jun (c. 200 – 265) of Cao Wei during the Three Kingdoms. No examples still exist, but many extant ancient Chinese texts mention them, showing they were used intermittently until about 1300. Some of the texts include information about their inner components and workings.

There were probably several types of south-pointing chariots that worked differently. In most or all of them, the rotating road wheels mechanically operated a geared mechanism to keep the pointer aimed correctly. The pointer was aimed southward by hand at the start of a journey. Subsequently, whenever the chariot turned, the mechanism rotated the pointer relative to the body of the chariot to counteract the turn. This kept the pointer aiming in a constant direction, equal to the starting position. Thus the mechanism did a kind of directional dead reckoning, which is inherently prone to cumulative errors and uncertainties. Some chariots' mechanisms may have had differential gears.

== Historical texts ==
=== Earliest sources ===
An image of a south-pointing chariot from Sancai Tuhui (first published 1609)

The south-pointing chariot, a mechanical-geared, wheeled vehicle used to discern the southern cardinal direction (without magnetics), was given a brief description by Ma's contemporary Fu Xuan. The contemporary 3rd century source of the Weilüe, written by the East Han dynasty politician Yuan Huan also described the south-pointing chariot of belonging to the Chinese mechanical engineer and politician Ma Jun. The Jin dynasty (266–420) era text of the Shu Zheng Ji (Records of Military Expeditions), written by Guo Yuansheng, recorded that south-pointing chariots were often stored in the northern gatehouse of the Government Workshops (Shang Fang) of the capital city. However, the later written Song Shu (Book of Song) (6th century) recorded the south-pointing chariot's design and use in further detail, as well as creating the background legend of the device's (supposed) use long before Ma's time, in the Western Zhou dynasty (1050–771 BC). The book also provided a description of the south-pointing chariot's re-invention and use in times after Ma Jun and the Three Kingdoms. The 6th-century text, translated by the British scientist and historian Joseph Needham, reads as follows (the south-pointing chariot is referred to as the south-pointing carriage):

The south-pointing carriage was first constructed by the Duke of Zhou (beginning of the 1st millennium BC) as a means of conducting homewards certain envoys who had arrived from a great distance beyond the frontiers. The country to be traversed was a boundless plain, in which people lost their bearings as to east and west, so (the Duke) caused this vehicle to be made in order that the ambassadors should be able to distinguish north and south. The Gui Gu Zi book says that the people of the State of Zheng, when collecting jade, always carried with them a 'south-pointer', and by means of this were never in doubt (as to their position). During the Qin and Former Han dynasties, however, nothing more was heard of the vehicle. In the Later Han period, Zhang Heng re-invented it, but owing to the confusion and turmoil at the close of the dynasty it was not preserved.

In the State of Wei, (in the San Guo period) Gaotong Long and Qin Lang were both famous scholars; they disputed about the south-pointing carriage before the court, saying that there was no such thing, and that the story was nonsense. But during the Qing-long reign period (233–237) the emperor Ming Di commissioned the scholar Ma Jun to construct one, and he duly succeeded. This again was lost during the troubles attending the establishment of the Jin dynasty.

Later on, Shi Hu (emperor of the Jie Later Zhao dynasty) had one made by Xie Fei, and again Linghu Sheng made one for Yao Xing (emperor of the Later Qin dynasty). The latter was obtained by emperor An Di of the Jin in the 13th year of the Yi-xi reign-period (417), and it finally came into the hands of emperor Wu Di of the Liu Song dynasty when he took over the administration of Chang'an. Its appearance and construction was like that of a drum-carriage (odometer). A wooden figure of a man was placed at the top, with its arm raised and pointing to the south, (and the mechanism was arranged in such a way that) although the carriage turned round and round, the pointer-arm still indicated the south. In State processions, the south-pointing carriage led the way, accompanied by the imperial guard.

These vehicles, constructed as they had been by barbarian (Qiang) workmen, did not function particularly well. Though called south-pointing carriages, they very often did not point true, and had to negotiate curves step by step, with the help of someone inside to adjust the machinery. The ingenious man from Fanyang, Zi Zu Chongzhi frequently said, therefore, that a new (and properly automatic) south-pointing carriage ought to be constructed. So towards the close of the Sheng-Ming reign period (477–479) the emperor Shun Di, during the premiership of the Prince of Qi, commissioned (Zi Zu Chongzhi) to make one, and when it was completed it was tested by Wang Seng-qian, military governor of Tanyang, and Liu Hsiu, president of the Board of Censors. The workmanship was excellent, and although the carriage was twisted and turned in a hundred directions, the hand never failed to point to the south. Under the Jin, moreover, there had also been a south-pointing ship.

The last sentence of the passage is of great interest for navigation at sea, since the magnetic compass used for seafaring navigation was not used until the time of Shen Kuo (1031–1095). Although the Song Shu text describes earlier precedents of the south-pointing chariot before the time of Ma Jun, this is not entirely credible, as there are no pre-Han or Han dynasty era texts that describe the device. In fact, the first known source to describe stories of its legendary use during the Zhou period was the Gu Jin Zhu book of Cui Bao (c. 300), written soon after the Three Kingdoms era. Cui Bao also wrote that the intricate details of construction for the device were once written in the Shang Fang Gu Shi (Traditions of the Imperial Workshops), but the book was lost by his time.

=== Japan ===
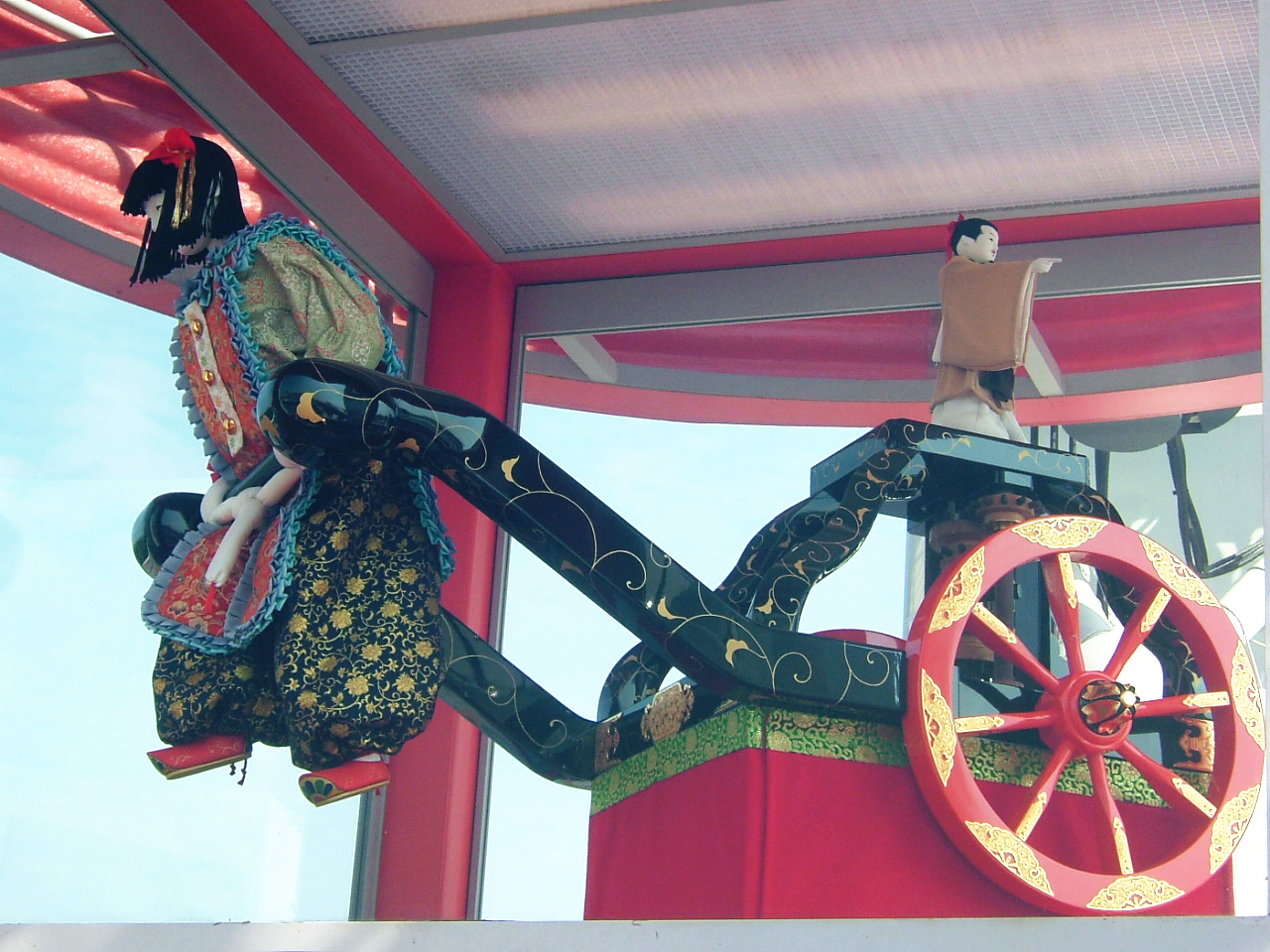
Children's instructive toy chariot in Chinese display at Expo 2005 in Japan

The invention of the south-pointing chariot also made its way to Japan by the 7th century. The Nihon Shoki (The Chronicles of Japan) of 720 described the earlier Chinese Buddhist monks Zhi Yu and Zhi You constructing several south-pointing Chariots for Emperor Tenji of Japan in 658. This was followed up by several more chariot devices built in 666 as well.

=== Song Shi ===
The south-pointing chariot was also combined with the earlier Han dynasty era invention of the odometer, a mechanical device used to measure distance traveled, and found in all modern automobiles. It was mentioned in the Song dynasty (960–1279) historical text of the Song Shi (compiled in 1345) that the engineers Yan Su (in 1027) and Wu Deren (in 1107) both created south-pointing chariots, which it details as follows. (In Needham's translation, inches and feet (ft) are used as units of distance. 1 inch is 25.4 millimetres. 1 ft is 12 inches or 304.8 mm.)

In the 5th year of the Tian-Sheng reign period of the emperor Renzong (1027), Yan Su, a Divisional Director in the Ministry of Works, made a south-pointing carriage. He memorialised the throne, saying, [after the usual historical introduction]: "Throughout the Five Dynasties and until the reigning dynasty there has been, so far as I know, no one who has been able to construct such a vehicle. But now I have invented a design myself and have succeeded in completing it".

"The method involves using a carriage with a single pole (for two horses). Above the outside framework of the body of the carriage let there be a cover in two stories. Set a wooden image of a xian (immortal) at the top, stretching out its arm to indicate the south. Use 9 wheels, great and small, with a total of 120 teeth, i.e. 2 foot-wheels (i.e. road-wheels, on which the carriage runs) 6 ft. high and 18 ft. in circumference, attached to the foot wheels, 2 vertical subordinate wheels, 2.4 ft. in diameter and 7.2 ft. in circumference, each with 24 teeth, the teeth being at intervals of 3 inches apart.

"... Then below the crossbar at the end of the pole, two small vertical wheels 3 inches in diameter and pierced by an iron axle, to the left 1 small horizontal wheel, 1.2 feet in diameter, with 12 teeth, to the right 1 small horizontal wheel, 1.2 ft. in diameter, with 12 teeth, in the middle 1 large horizontal wheel, of diameter 4.8 ft. and circumference 14.4 ft., with 48 teeth, the teeth at intervals of 3 inches apart; in the middle a vertical shaft piercing the center (of the large horizontal wheel) 8 ft. high and 3 inches in diameter; at the top carrying the wooden figure of the xian.

"When the carriage moves (southward) let the wooden figure point south. When it runs (and goes) eastwards, the (back end of the) pole is pushed to the right; the subordinate wheel attached to the right road-wheel will turn forward 12 teeth, drawing with it the right small horizontal wheel one revolution (and so) pushing the central large horizontal wheel to revolve a quarter turn to the left. When it has turned around 12 teeth, the carriage moves eastwards, and the wooden figure stands crosswise and points south. If (instead) it turns (and goes) westwards, the (back end of the) pole is pushed to the left; the subordinate wheel attached to the left road-wheel will turn forward with the road-wheel 12 teeth, drawing with it the left small horizontal wheel one revolution, and pushing the central large horizontal wheel to revolve a quarter turn to the right. When it has turned round 12 teeth, the carriage moves due west, but still the wooden figure stands crosswise and points south. If one wishes to travel northwards, the turning round, whether by east or west, is done in the same way."

After this initial description of Yan Su's device, the text continues to describe the work of Wu Deren, who crafted a wheeled device that would combine the odometer and south-pointing chariot:

It was ordered that the method should be handed down to the (appropriate) officials so that the machine might be made. In the first year of the Da-Guan reign period (1107), the Chamberlain Wu Deren presented specifications of the south-pointing carriage and the carriage with the li-recording drum (odometer). The two vehicles were made, and were first used that year at the great ceremony of the ancestral sacrifice.

The body of the south-pointing carriage was 11.15 ft. (long), 9.5 ft. wide, and 10.9 ft. deep. The carriage wheels were 5.7 ft. in diameter, the carriage pole 10.5 ft. long, and the carriage body in two stories, upper and lower. In the middle was placed a partition. Above there stood a figure of a xian holding a rod, on the left and right were tortoises and cranes, one each on either side, and four figures of boys each holding a tassel. In the upper story there were at the four corners trip-mechanisms, and also 13 horizontal wheels, each 1.85 ft. in diameter, 5.55 ft. in circumference, with 32 teeth at intervals of 1.8 inches apart. A central shaft, mounted on the partition, pierced downwards.

In the lower story were 13 wheels. In the middle was the largest horizontal wheel, 3.8 ft. in diameter, 11.4 ft. in circumference, and having 100 teeth at intervals of 2.1 inches apart. (On vertical axles) reaching to the top (of the compartment) left and right, were two small horizontal wheels which could rise and fall, having an iron weight (attached to) each. Each of these was 1.1 ft. in diameter and 3.3 ft. in circumference, with 17 teeth, at intervals of 1.9 inches apart. Again, to left and right, were attached wheels, one on each side, in diameter 1.55 ft., in circumference 4.65 ft., and having 24 teeth, at intervals of 2.1 inches.

Left and right, too, were double gear-wheels (lit. tier-wheels), a pair on either side. Each of the lower component gears was 2.1 ft. in diameter and 6.3 ft. in circumference, with 32 teeth, at intervals of 2.1 inches apart. Each of the upper component gears was 1.2 ft. in diameter and 3.6 ft. in circumference, with 32 teeth, at intervals of 1.1 inches apart. On each of the road-wheels of the carriage, left and right, was a vertical wheel 2.2 ft. in diameter, 6.6 ft. in circumference, with 32 teeth at intervals of 2.25 inches apart. Both to left and right at the back end of the pole there were small wheels without teeth (pulleys), from which hung bamboo cords, and both were tied above the left and right (ends of the) axle (of the carriage) respectively.

If the carriage turns to the right, it causes the small pulley to the left of the back end of the pole to let down the left-hand (small horizontal) wheel. If it turns to the left, it causes the small pulley to the right of the back end of the pole to let down the right (small horizontal) wheel. However, the carriage moves the xian and the boys stand crosswise and point south. The carriage is harnessed with two red horses, bearing frontlets of bronze.

== Chariots with differential gears ==
=== Background and explanation ===
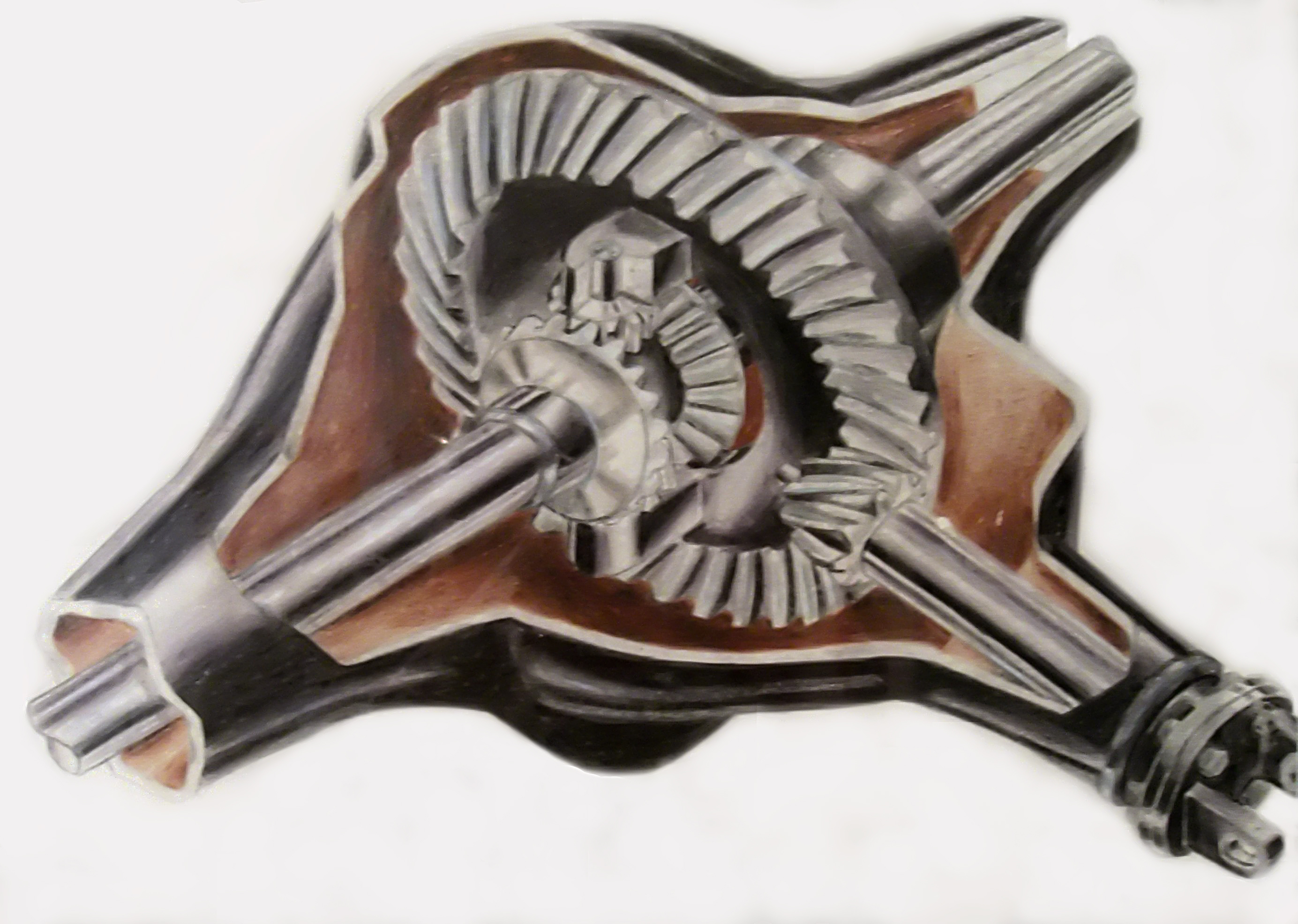
An illustration of a differential between the drive shaft (at bottom right) and driving wheels of an automobile

The English engineer George Lanchester proposed that some south-pointing chariots employed differential gears. A differential is an assembly of gears, nowadays used in almost all automobiles except some electric and hybrid-electric versions, which has three shafts linking it to the external world. They are conveniently labelled A, B, and C. The gears cause the rotation speed of Shaft A to be proportional to the sum of the rotation speeds of Shafts B and C. There are no other limitations on the rotation speeds of the shafts.

In an automobile, Shaft A is connected to the engine (through the transmission), and Shafts B and C are connected to two road wheels, one on each side of the vehicle. When the vehicle turns, the wheel going around the outside of the turning curve has to roll further and rotate faster than the wheel on the inside. The differential permits this to happen while both wheels are being driven by the engine. If the sum of the speeds of the wheels is constant, the speed of the engine does not change.

In a south-pointing chariot, according to the hypothesis, Shaft B was connected to one road wheel and Shaft C was connected through a direction-reversing gear to the other road wheel. This made Shaft A rotate at a speed that was proportional to the difference between the rotation speeds of the two wheels. The pointing doll was connected (possibly through intermediate gears) to Shaft A. When the chariot moved in a straight line, the two wheels turned at equal speeds, and the doll did not rotate. When the chariot turned, the wheels rotated at different speeds (for the same reason as in an automobile), so the differential caused the doll to rotate, compensating for the turning of the chariot.

The hypothesis that there were south-pointing chariots with differential gears originated in the 20th century. People who were familiar with modern (e.g. automotive) uses of differentials interpreted some of the ancient Chinese descriptions in ways that agreed with their own ideas. Essentially, they re-invented the south-pointing chariot, as it had previously been re-invented several times in antiquity. Working chariots that use differentials have been constructed in recent decades. Whether any such chariots existed previously is not known with certainty.

Although the Antikythera mechanism is believed to have used differential gears, the first true differential gear definitely known to have been used was by Joseph Williamson in 1720. He used a differential to display on separate fixed dials driven by the clock's pendulum mean and solar time. Before that, clockmakers had displayed mean and solar time on a single dial with hands which followed mean time but with a separate ring driven by a kidney cam which moved forwards and backwards to follow the equation of time.

=== Geometrical properties ===
If the south-pointing chariot were built perfectly accurately, using a differential gear, and if it travelled on an Earth that was perfectly smooth, it would have interesting properties. It would be a mechanical compass that transports a direction, given by the pointer, along the path it travels. Mathematically the device performs parallel transport along the path it travels.

The chariot can be used to detect straight lines or geodesics. A path on a surface the chariot travels along is a geodesic if and only if the pointer does not rotate with respect to the base of the chariot.

Because of the curvature of the Earth's surface (due to it being curved around as a globe), the chariot would generally not continue to point due south as it moves. For example, if the chariot moves along a geodesic (as approximated by any great circle) the pointer should instead stay at a fixed angle to the path. Also, if two chariots travel by different routes between the same starting and finishing points, their pointers, which were aimed in the same direction at the start, usually do not point in the same direction at the finish. Likewise, if a chariot goes around a closed loop, starting and finishing at the same point on the Earth's surface, its pointer generally does not aim in the same direction at the finish as it did at the start. The difference is the holonomy of the path, and is proportional to the enclosed area. If the journeys are short compared with the radius of the Earth, these discrepancies are small and may have no practical importance. Nevertheless, they show that this type of chariot, based on differential gears, would be an imperfect compass even if constructed exactly and used in ideal conditions.

=== Lack of precision, and implications ===
Real machines are never built perfectly accurately. Simple geometry shows that if the chariot's mechanism is based on a differential gear and if, for example, the width of the track of the chariot (the separation between its wheels) is three metres, and if the wheels are intended to be identical but actually differ in diameter by one part in a thousand, then if the chariot travels one kilometre in a straight line, the "south-pointing" figure will rotate nearly twenty degrees. If it initially points exactly to the south, at the end of the one-kilometre trip it will point almost to the south-southeast or south-southwest, depending on which wheel is the larger. If the chariot travels nine kilometres, the figure will end up pointing almost due north. Obviously, this would make it useless as a south-pointing compass. To be a useful navigational tool, the figure would have to rotate no more than a couple of degrees over a journey of a hundred kilometres, but this would require the chariot's wheels to be equal in diameter to within one part in a million. Even if the process of manufacturing the wheels were capable of this precision (which would not be possible with ancient Chinese methods), it is doubtful that the equality of the wheels could be maintained for long as they are subjected to the wear and tear of travelling across open country. Irregularity of the ground would add further errors to the device's functioning.

Considerable scepticism is therefore warranted as to whether this type of south-pointing chariot, using a differential gear for the whole time, was used in practice to navigate over long distances. Conceivably, the south-pointing doll was fixed to the body of the chariot while it was travelling in straight lines, and coupled to the differential only when the chariot was turning. The charioteer could have operated a control to do this just before and after making each turn, or maybe shouted commands to someone inside the chariot who connected and disconnected the doll and the differential. This could have been done without stopping the chariot. If turns were brief and rare, this would have greatly reduced the pointing errors, since they would have accumulated only during the short periods when the doll and differential were connected. However, it raises the problem of how the chariot could have been kept travelling in straight lines with sufficient accuracy without using the pointing doll.

If the real purposes of the chariot and the accounts of it were amusement and impressing visiting foreigners, rather than actual long-distance navigation, then its inaccuracy might not have been important. Considering that a large mechanical wagon or chariot would be obligated to travel on roads, the destination in question would typically not be in an unknown direction. The fact that the sources cited above mention that the chariot was placed at the front of processions, its high level of mechanical complexity and fragility, and that it was 'reinvented' several times contribute to the conclusion that it was not used for navigation, as a truly practical and useful navigational tool would not be forgotten or left unused.

== Chariots without differential gears ==
Although the hypothesis that the south-pointing chariot used differential gears has gained wide acceptance, it should be recognized that functional south-pointing chariots without differential gears are possible. The ancient descriptions are often unclear, but they suggest that the Chinese implemented several different designs, at least some of which did not include differentials.

=== Mechanical designs ===
Some of the ancient descriptions suggest that some south-pointing chariots could move in only three ways: straight ahead, or turning left or right with a fixed radius of curvature. A third wheel might have been used to fix the turning radius. If the chariot was turning, the pointing doll was connected by gears to one or other of the two main road wheels (e.g. whichever was on the outside of the curve around which the chariot was moving) so the doll rotated at a fixed speed, relative to the rate of the chariot's movement, to compensate for the predetermined rate of turn. The doll turned in opposite directions depending on which road wheel was connected to it, so its rotation compensated for the chariot turning left or right. This design would have been simpler than using a differential gear.

The chariots of Yan Su and Wu Deren appear to have used this type of mechanism. (See descriptions quoted from the Song Shi, above.) Apart from the presence of components in Wu Deren's vehicle to make it function as an odometer, there were only minor differences between them. In each chariot, the two main road wheels were attached to vertical gear wheels. A large horizontal gear wheel was linked (possibly via intermediate gearing) to the pointing doll, and was positioned so a diameter almost spanned the space between the uppermost points of the vertical gear wheels. When the chariot was moving straight ahead, there was no connection between these gears, but when the chariot turned, a small gear wheel was lowered into contact with the horizontal gear and one of the vertical gears, thus linking the doll to one of the road wheels. Two small gear wheels were available, one to connect the horizontal gear to each of the vertical ones. Of course, they were not used simultaneously. The small gear wheels were raised and lowered by an arrangement of weights, pulleys and cords which were attached to the pole to which the horses that pulled the chariot were harnessed. When the horses moved to one side or the other, in order to turn the chariot, the pole moved and the cords lowered the appropriate small gear wheel into its working position. When the horses returned to walking straight ahead, the small gear wheel was raised out of contact with the main horizontal and vertical gears. Thus the system functioned automatically. The mirror-symmetry of the vertical gears being linked by the small gears to the horizontal gear at diametrically opposite points caused the horizontal gear to rotate in opposite directions depending on which road wheel was linked to it, thus rotating the pointing doll in opposite directions when the chariot turned left and right.

The description does not mention a third road wheel to fix the turning radius, but it is possible that such a wheel was present. No gears would have been attached to it, so perhaps the author of the description did not mention it because he did not realize that it was an important part of the mechanism. Putting such a wheel on the chariot and making it function properly would not have been difficult. It might have been attached to the pole to which the horses were harnessed. Stops would have been provided to limit the motions of the pole to left and right.

If a third road wheel was included, this type of south-pointing chariot could have worked quite accurately as a compass when used for short journeys under good conditions, but if used for long journeys it would have been subject to cumulative errors, like chariots using the differential mechanism.

If in fact there was no third road wheel, the chariot might have functioned as a compass if turns were always made so that one of the two wheels was stationary and only the other rotated, with the pointing doll connected to it by gears. The charioteer could have kept the stationary wheel from turning by controlling the horses appropriately. (A brake would have helped, but there is no mention of one in the description.) The radius of the curve around which the rotating wheel moved would have equalled the track-width of the chariot, and the gears turning the doll would have been chosen accordingly. This design would have worked as a compass for short journeys, but would have suffered from cumulative errors if used for long ones. Also, the chariot would have been slow and awkward to turn. This might not have mattered if turns were rarely executed.

The Song Shi description of the gears in Yan Su's chariot, and the numbers of teeth on them, suggests that it worked this way, without a third road wheel. The gear ratios would have been correct if the pointing doll was attached directly to the large horizontal gear wheel, and the track-width of the chariot equalled the diameter of the road wheels. Wu Deren's chariot also appears to have been designed to work this way. The width of the chariot, and therefore presumably the track-width, was greater than the diameter of the wheels. The gear ratios were appropriate for these dimensions.

The charioteer would have had to use great skill to ensure that the radius of each turn of the chariot was correct to make one of the wheels exactly stop rotating. Unless he did this correctly, the pointing doll would not have kept aiming to the south. He would have been able to adjust the direction in which it aimed by making turns that were more or less sharp. This would sometimes have given him opportunities to use the chariot dishonestly. If it was being demonstrated to spectators, for example, and was being driven around in front of them, making many turns, the charioteer, who would have known which way was south, would have been able to make the chariot appear to work extremely accurately as a compass for long periods. The spectators could have been shown the machinery, and would have seen that the charioteer could not manipulate the doll. They would presumably have been impressed by the apparent accuracy of the mechanism. It is possible that this type of chariot was sometimes constructed with the prime purpose of fraudulently impressing spectators. Possibly, people who built these chariots deceived their own employers with them, which could have gained them fame and fortune provided nobody tried using the chariots for real navigation.

Other mechanical designs for the south-pointing chariot are also possible, including ones that employ a device that is used today, the gyrocompass. However, there is no indication that the ancient Chinese knew of these.

=== Non-mechanical possibilities ===
Some south-pointing chariots may not have been purely mechanical devices. Someone riding inside the chariot may have used some non-mechanical method of determining the compass directions, and turned the doll on top of the chariot accordingly. There are several methods that could have been used, for example:

- By using a magnetic compass. The Chinese were using this for navigation by the 11th century, when south-pointing chariots were still being made and used.
- By using astronomical observations of the Sun or stars (e.g. the Pole Star). Chinese astronomical knowledge was extensive.
- By using local knowledge. The person in the chariot may have known the area or had a map or description of it.
- By observing the polarization of light from the sky.
- By observing light that had been refracted by the Earth's atmosphere. This is one of the techniques that were used by Polynesian navigators to steer ships among Pacific islands. When the surface of the Earth, ocean or ground, is colder than the air above it, a dense layer of air is formed near the surface, which refracts light downward. The result is that light can go around the curvature of the Earth, allowing things to be seen at much greater distances than simple geometry would predict. The images are very distorted, but they can be recognized by skilled navigators. Certain other Polynesian techniques can also be used on land and may have been employed by the Chinese.

Unlike mechanisms that rely on the rotation of road wheels, most of these methods can be used at sea. This may account for the mention (see "Earliest sources" above) that a marine version of the south-pointing chariot existed.

These methods can work accurately over long distances, unlike the mechanical designs for the chariot.

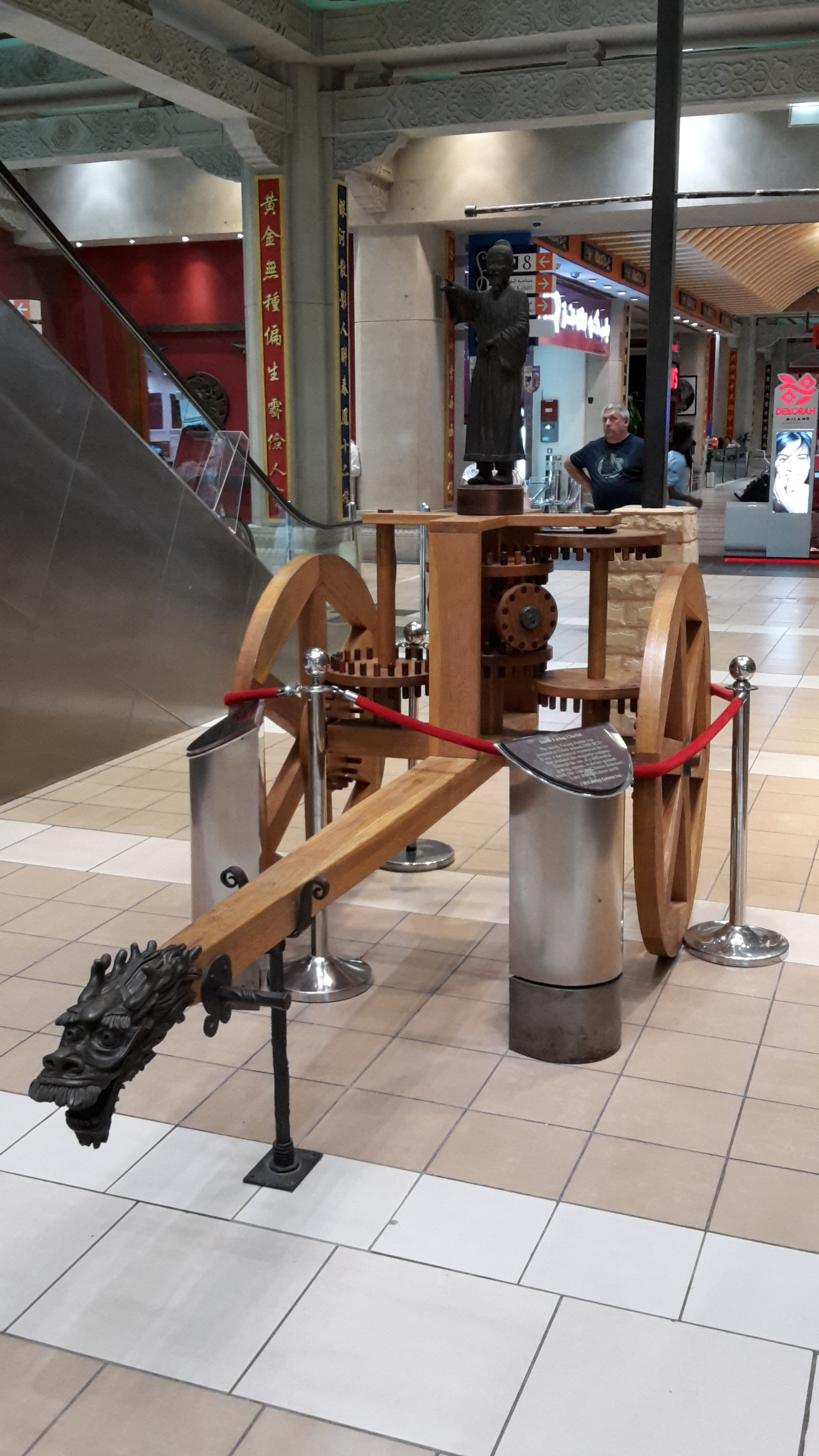
South-pointing chariot replica at the Ibn Battuta Mall, Dubai

== See also ==
- Chariots in ancient China
- Chinese war wagon
- History of science and technology in China
- List of Chinese inventions
- Mechanical engineering
