= Onésiphore Pecqueur =

French mechanical engineer (1792–1852)

Onésiphore Pecqueur (1792–1852) was a French mechanical engineer who patented the modern-day differential gear, found on the axles that connect to the powertrain of all automobiles.

== Early life ==
He was born in the Pas-de-Calais.

== Career ==
He worked as a watchmaker. In 1823 he won the National Exhibition Gold Medal for inventing a watch that showed sidereal and mean time.

He invented the differential in 1827 (known in French as the différentiel mécanique). He invented it whilst at the Conservatoire des Arts et Métiers. It was derived from his work as a watchmaker, whereby cogs move at different rates. The differential allowed the adjustment of rotational ratios of two wheels turning on the same axle.

== Personal life ==
He died in Paris in 1852.
