= Out-flow radial turbine =

Radial means that the fluid is flowing in radial direction that is either from inward to outward or from outward to inward, with respect to the runner shaft axis. If the fluid is flowing from inward to outward then it is called outflow radial turbine.

1. In this turbine, the working fluid enters around the axis of the wheel and then flows outwards (i.e., towards the outer periphery of the wheel).
2. The guide vane mechanism is typically surrounded by the runner/turbine.
3. In this turbine, the inner diameter of the runner is the inlet and outer diameter is an outlet.

Most practical radial outflow turbines are Reaction-type turbines, whereas the converse, radial inflow turbines can be either reaction type, impulse type (in the case of a typical turbo-supercharger), or intermediate (in the case of Francis turbines for example.)

== Components of Out-flow Turbine ==
The Main Components of Reaction Turbine are :

- Casing/ Involute: Typically the Runner shaft bearings, rotating seals, guide vane assembly and inlet tube are mounted to the casing
- Guide Vanes: In liquid turbines these are also sometimes referred to as Wicket gates. These convert some of the pressure energy into momentum energy, but their main functions are to control the flow rate and impart an average tangential velocity on the fluid greater than or equal to the tangential velocity of the runner inlets. In an OFRT these are typically mounted concentrically, in the same plane as the turbine. However the guide vanes can also be designed in an axial or diagonal/mixed configuration.
- Runner/Turbine: The passage between the blades has a converging-diverging profile. The majority of the head loss or pressure drop occurs as the working fluid passes through the turbine in radial outflow design. The runner is connected to the shaft which rotates along with it and thus this can be used for power production. Depending on the design, the flow through the turbine may be strictly planar, or it may enter the turbine axially and undergo a 90° turn therein.
- Draft Tube: It is connected to outlet of the turbine which assists fluid exiting the spiral casing. It is used because the exit pressure may becomes less than the stagnation pressure within the tail race and thus it may become difficult for the fluid to proceed downstream causing choked-flow. To make it exit from the tail race/involute it's necessary to provide diverging cross section so that the pressure can increase while the linear velocity greatly decreases.

== Comparison between inward and outward radial flow reaction turbine ==
Inward flow reaction turbine	Outward flow reaction turbine
Fluid enters at outer periphery of runner and flows radially inward toward the centre thus flow is radially inwards toward the centre.	Here the flow is radially outwards and the fluid gets discharged at the outer periphery of the runner
Centrifugal head h= (u2^2 -u1^2 )/2g but u2<u1 which means that the centrifugal head imparted on fluid during the flow through runner is negative.	Centrifugal head h= (u2^2 -u1^2 )/2g but u2>u1 which means that the centrifugal head imparted on fluid during the flow through runner is positive.
Easy speed control and load following.	Difficult to control the speed.
Discharge is constant.	Discharge increases.
Used in medium and high head conditions.	Used in small head conditions.
Difference in tangential velocity between the runner inlet and outlet positively contributes to the shaft power.	Difference in tangential velocity between the runner inlet and outlet negatively impacts shaft power.

== Advantages ==
Some of the advantages of radial outflow turbine are:

- The configuration of radial flow turbine is simple, similar to a centrifugal compressor.
- Radial flow turbines are mechanically robust compared to axial turbines and they are easy to configure. As a result of that they were considered for the application before axial turbine. They are more tolerant of overspeed and temporary temperature extremes.
- Radial flow turbines have higher energy extraction capability in one single stage.
- Because the high pressure side is near the rotational axis (at low radius), it is possible to keep leakage losses lower than with other reaction turbines (Ljungström, axial or in-flow radial). This is more important in small turbines where complex rotating seal systems aren't cost effective.

Radial flow turbines are generally more preferred in small turbines because of simpler construction. Radial flow turbine rotor does not use aerofoil sections, as a result of which the rotor of radial flow turbine has a shape very similar to a centrifugal compressor and it uses 3D shape for energy extraction. They are more conducive to being produced from a single casting or round billet as a Bladed-disk or "blisk."
