= Luigi Torchi (inventor) =

Italian inventor

- Born: c. 1812; Italy

Luigi Torchi was an Italian inventor. He invented the first direct multiplication machine in 1834. This was also the second key-driven machine in the world, following that of James White in 1822.

Very little is known about the inventor and the machine. It is only known that he was a carpenter; his machine was awarded a gold medal from the Imperial-regio istituto lombardo di scienze, lettere e arti in Milan in 1834. A document of the award provides the known details of the machine, while a second document shows a drawing of the machine itself. However, no detailed documents about how it worked are known to exist.

The machine was exhibited in Brera between 1834 and 1837; it was later found by Giovanni Schiaparelli in bad condition. Subsequently, no further information about the machine exists.

== Bibliography ==
- Silvio Hénin, Two Early Italian Key-Driven Calculators, IEEE Annals of the History of Computing, vol. 32, no. 1, 2010, pp. 34–43.
- Silvio Hénin, Early Italian computing machines and their inventors. Reflections on the History of Computing. Springer, Berlin, Heidelberg, 2012. 204–230.
