= Fu Xuan =

Chinese historian, poet and politician (217-278)

Fu Xuan 傅玄
- Born: 217; Yaozhou District, Tongchuan, Shaanxi
- Died: 278 (aged 61)
- Other name: Xiuyi (休奕)
- Occupations: Historian, poet, politician
- Children: Fu Xian (239-294)
- Father: Fu Gan
- Relatives: Fu Xie (grandfather)

Fu Xuan (217 – 278 (Note: Fu Xuan's biography in Book of Jin indicate that he died at the age of 62 (by East Asian reckoning) after Yang Huiyu's death (in c.July 278).)), courtesy name Xiuyi, posthumous name Gang (刚), was a Chinese historian, poet, and politician who lived in the state of Cao Wei during the Three Kingdoms period and later under the Jin dynasty. He was one of the most prolific authors of fu poetry of his time. He was a grandson of Fu Xie (傅燮; died c.May 187), (Note: The annals of Emperor Ling in Book of the Later Han recorded that Fu Xie, who was then Administrator of Hanyang, was killed in action against Han Sui in the 4th month of the 4th year of the Zhongping era; the month corresponds to 26 Apr to 25 May 187 in the Julian calendar.) a son of Fu Gan (傅幹; 175 (Note: Fu Xie's biography in Houhanshu recorded that Fu Gan was 13 (by East Asian reckoning) just before Xie's death.) - 220s), and the father of Fu Xian (傅咸).

== Life ==
Although he lost his father early and grew up poor, Fu Xuan eventually became famous in literature and music. Nominated as a civil service candidate by the local provincial government, he was appointed as a Gentleman (郎中) and put in charge of managing the compilation of the historical text Records of the Three Kingdoms (三國志). Later, he became a subordinate of Sima Zhao, the regent of Wei from 255 to 265. He rose through the ranks to become the Administrator (太守) of Hongnong Commandery (弘農郡) and Colonel of Agriculture (典農校尉). In 266, after Sima Yan usurped the Wei throne and established the Jin dynasty (266–420) with himself as the new emperor in February, he appointed Fu Xuan as a Regular Mounted Attendant (散騎常侍) and awarded him the title of a Viscount (子爵). Later, Fu Xuan was reassigned to be a Commandant of Escorting Cavalry (駙馬都尉).

Fu Xuan was recommended to the position of Palace Attendant but was dismissed from consideration after a falling out. In 268, he became Palace Assistant Imperial Clerk (御史中丞), and in 269 Minister Coachman (太僕). (Note: Sima Guang thought that Fu Xuan's biography in Jin Shu made an error in recording that Fu was made Minister Coachman in the 5th year of the Xianning era (c.279) when Yang Huiyu had died the previous year. 269 was the 5th year of the Tai'shi era (Emperor Wu's first era name).) He authored a memorial to suggest ways of preparing for floods and external invasions. He later served as the Colonel-Director of Retainers (司隷校尉). He was of such an impatient disposition that whenever he had any memorial or impeachment to submit, he would proceed at once to the palace, no matter what the hour of the day or night, and sit there until he had audience the following dawn. It was while thus waiting that he caught a chill from which he subsequently died.

Fu Xuan also once wrote an essay praising the Chinese mechanical engineers Ma Jun and Zhang Heng, where he lamented the fact that extraordinary talents of natural geniuses were often ignored or neglected by those in charge.

== Writings ==
According to his biography in the Book of Jin, Fu Xuan wrote over a hundred volumes of the Wen Ji (文集), the Fu Zi (傅子), and over 120 texts, of which only a small fraction survived to this day. The Fu Zi, for example, survives only in the form of annotations added by Pei Songzhi in the fifth century to the third-century text Records of the Three Kingdoms. Fu Xuan expressed in his writings a critical view of a number of his contemporaries, including both supporters and enemies of Sima Zhao.

== Poetry ==
Fu Xuan's poems, primarily in the yuefu style, are noted for their powerful and empathetic portrayals of women. Translations of several of his sixty-odd surviving poems can be found in the book New Songs from a Jade Terrace by Anne Birrell (ISBN 0-04-895026-2).

One of the more famous poems by Fu Xuan is "Woman":

How sad it is to be a woman!!
Nothing on earth is held so cheap.
Boys stand leaning at the door
Like Gods fallen out of Heaven.
Their hearts brave the Four Oceans,
The wind and dust of a thousand miles.
No one is glad when a girl is born:
By her the family sets no store.
When she grows up, she hides in her room
Afraid to look at a man in the face.
No one cries when she leaves her home—Sudden as clouds when the rain stops.
She bows her head and composes her face,
Her teeth are pressed on her red lips:
She bows and kneels countless times.
She must humble herself even to the servants.
His love is distant as the stars in Heaven,
Yet the sunflower bends towards the sun.
Their hearts are more sundered than water and fire—A hundred evils are heaped upon her.
Her face will follow the years changes:
Her lord will find new pleasures.
They that were once like the substance and shadow
Are now as far from Hu as from Ch'in [two distant places]
Yet Hu and Ch'in shall sooner meet
That they whose parting is like Ts'an and Ch'en [two stars]

== See also ==
- Lists of people of the Three Kingdoms
- Poetry
- Chinese poetry
- List of Chinese people
- Chinese poets
- Feminism
- Feminist movement
