= List of Greek inventions and discoveries =

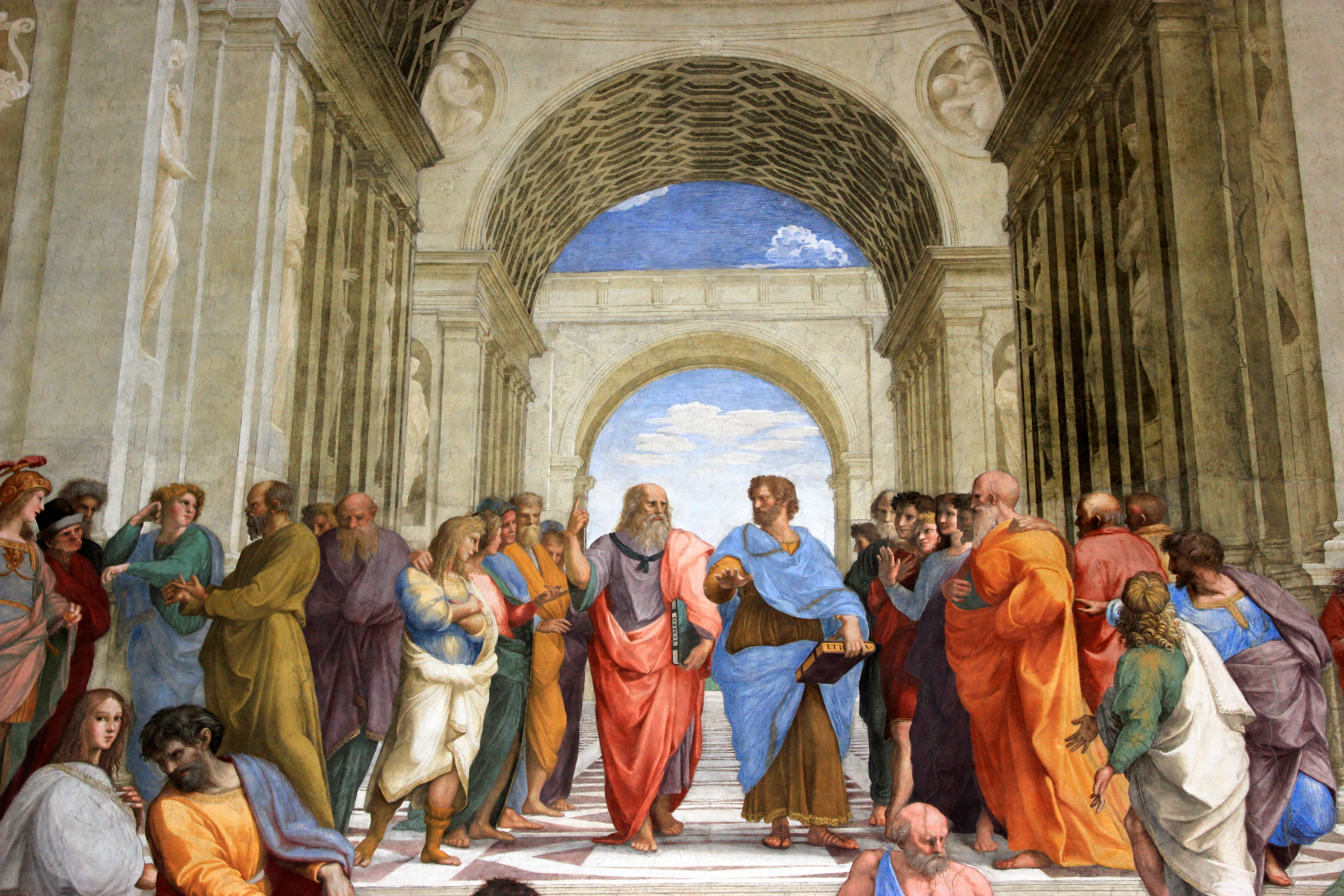
The School of Athens, a famous fresco by the Italian Renaissance artist Raphael, with Plato and Aristotle as the central figures in the scene.

Greek inventions and discoveries are objects, processes or techniques invented, innovated or discovered, partially or entirely, by Greeks.

Greek people have made major innovations to mathematics, astronomy, chemistry, engineering, architecture, and medicine. Other major Greek contributions include being the birth of Western civilization, democracy, Western literature, history, Western logic, political science, physics, theatre, comedy, drama, tragedy, lyric poetry, biology, Western sculpture, Olympic Games, Western philosophy, ancient Greek law, Greek mythology, Greek food and the Greek Alphabet.

The following is a list of inventions, innovations or discoveries known or generally recognized to be Greek.

== Alphabetical list of Greek inventions ==
.............................

=== A ===
- Acrolith: An acrolith is a composite sculpture made of stone together with other materials such as wood or inferior stone such as limestone, as in the case of a figure whose clothed parts are made of wood, while the exposed flesh parts such as head, hands, and feet are made of marble. The wood was covered either by drapery or by gilding. This type of statuary was common and widespread in Classical antiquity.
- Aerodynamics: Modern aerodynamics only dates back to the seventeenth century, but aerodynamic forces have been harnessed by humans for thousands of years in sailboats and windmills. Fundamental concepts of continuum, drag, and pressure gradients appear in the work of Aristotle and Archimedes.
- Air and water pumps: Ctesibius and various other Greeks of Alexandria of the period developed and put to practical use various air and water pumps which served a variety of purposes, such as a water organ and, by the 1st century AD, Heron's fountain.
- Alarm clock: The Hellenistic engineer and inventor Ctesibius (fl. 285–222 BC) fitted his clepsydras with a dial and pointer for indicating the time, and added elaborate "alarm systems, which could be made to drop pebbles on a gong, or blow trumpets (by forcing bell-jars down into water and taking the compressed air through a beating reed) at pre-set times" (Vitruv 11.11).
- Alchemy: Alchemy, a forerunner of chemistry, has its origin in Hellenistic Egypt.
- Algebra: Diophantus was an Alexandrian Greek mathematician and the author of a series of books called Arithmetica. These texts deal with solving algebraic equations, and have led, in number theory to the modern notion of Diophantine equation. In the context where algebra is identified with the theory of equations, Diophantus is credited as its inventor and thus the "father of algebra".
- Analog computer: In 1900–1901, the Antikythera mechanism was found in the Antikythera wreck. It is thought that this device was an analog computer designed to calculate astronomical positions and was used to predict lunar and solar eclipses based on Babylonian arithmetic-progression cycles. Whereas the Antikythera mechanism is considered a proper analog computer, the astrolabe (also invented by the Greeks) may be considered as a forerunner.
- Anarchism: anarchic attitudes were first articulated by tragedians such as Aeschylus and Sophocles who used the myth of Antigone to illustrate the conflict between rules set by the state and personal autonomy.
- Ancient Suez Canal: Opened by Greek engineers under Ptolemy II (283–246 BC), following earlier, probably only partly successful attempts.
- Anemoscope: Timosthenes invented the anemoscope.
- Arch bridge: Possibly the oldest existing arch bridge is the Mycenaean Arkadiko Bridge in Greece from about 1300 BC. The stone corbel arch bridge is still used by the local populace.
- Archimedes' heat ray: is a device that Archimedes is purported to have used to burn attacking Roman ships during the Siege of Syracuse (c. 213–212 BC). It does not appear in the surviving works of Archimedes and is described by historians writing many years after the siege.
- Aqueduct: Although particularly associated with the Romans, aqueducts were likely first used by the Minoans around 2000 BCE. The Minoans had developed what was then an extremely advanced irrigation system, including several aqueducts.
- Aqueduct (bridge): first built by the Minoans.
- Artificial Intelligence: Despite the Legends and Myths of the Greek Mythologies, Many ancient Greeks believed that many modern mechanisms could have their own will despite human labor to use them as tools. Many Greeks had Written stories that believe that intelligent mechanisms could pose a danger to human society thanks to the stories of Talos, Pandora, Pygmalion, Galatea and the Golden Maidens of the Greek god Hephaestus. By the year 3rd century BC, The first Artificial Intelligent Robot was created as a maiden named Philon by an unknown Greek Engineer marking the permanent beginning footsteps of Artificial Intelligence itself.
- Askomandoura: a type of bagpipe played as a traditional instrument on the Greek island of Crete, similar to the tsampouna.
- Association football: the earliest sports resembling association football are the ancient Greek games Phaininda and episkyros.
- Astrolabe: First used around 300 BC by astronomers in Greece. Used to determine the altitude of objects in the sky.
- Aulos: Ancient Greek wind instrument.
- Automata theory: Automata theory is the study of abstract machines and automata, as well as the computational problems that can be solved using them. It is a theory in theoretical computer science. The word automata comes from the Greek word αὐτόματος, which means "self-acting, self-willed, self-moving". An automaton (automata in plural) is an abstract self-propelled computing device which follows a predetermined sequence of operations automatically.
- Automaton: An automaton (automata or automatons) is a relatively self-operating machine, robot, or control mechanism designed to automatically follow a sequence of operations, or respond to predetermined instructions.
- Automatic doors: Heron of Alexandria, a 1st-century AD inventor from Alexandria, Egypt, created schematics for automatic doors to be used in a temple with the aid of steam power.
- Automation: Ctesibius described a float regulator for a water clock, a device not unlike the ball and cock in a modern flush toilet. This was the earliest feedback controlled mechanism.

=== B ===
- Baglamas: long necked bowl-lute, is a plucked string instrument used in Greek music; it is a smaller version of the bouzouki pitched an octave higher (nominally D-A-D), with unison pairs on the four highest strings and an octave pair on the lower D.
- Ballista: Greek missile weapon.
- Bathtub: The oldest bathtub was found on the island of Crete.
- Biochemistry: At its most comprehensive definition, biochemistry can be seen as a study of the components and composition of living things and how they come together to become life. In this sense, the history of biochemistry may therefore go back as far as the ancient Greeks.
- BlackBerry: Greek-Canadian businessman Mike Lazaridis founded BlackBerry, which created and manufactured the BlackBerry wireless hand-held device. Lazaridis served in various positions including co-chairman and Co-CEO of BlackBerry from 1984 to 2012 and Board Vice Chair and Chair of the Innovation Committee from 2012 to 2013.
- Black-figure pottery: one of the principal styles of painting on antique Greek vases. It was especially common between the 7th and 5th centuries BC, although there are specimens dating as late as the 2nd century BC.
- Bouzouki: Popular musical instrument in Greece.
- Body Armor: The Dendra panoply or Dendra armour is an example of Mycenaean-era panoply (full-body armor) made of bronze plates uncovered in the village of Dendra in the Argolid, Greece.

=== C ===
- Calipers: Earliest example found in the Giglio wreck near the Italian coast. The wooden piece already featured one fixed and a movable jaw.
- Calisthenics: a form of strength training that originated in ancient Greece.
- Caller ID: 1968, Theodore Paraskevakos, while working in as a communications engineer for SITA in Athens, Greece, began developing a system to automatically identify a telephone caller to a call recipient. Developing the method for the basis for modern-day Caller ID technology.
- Cameo (carving): A method of carving originating in Greece.
- Canal Lock: Built into Ancient Suez Canal under Ptolemy II.
- Cannon: Ctesibius of Alexandria invented a primitive form of the cannon, operated by compressed air.
- Catapult: The historian Diodorus Siculus mentions the invention of a mechanical arrow-firing catapult.
- Cella: The inner chamber of an ancient Greek or Roman temple in classical antiquity.
- Cement: cement, chemically speaking, is a product that includes lime as the primary binding ingredient. Lime (calcium oxide) was used on Crete and by the ancient Greeks. There is evidence that the Minoans of Crete used crushed potsherds as an artificial pozzolan for hydraulic cement. Nobody knows who first discovered that a combination of hydrated non-hydraulic lime and a pozzolan produces a hydraulic mixture (see also: Pozzolanic reaction), but such concrete was used by the Ancient Macedonians, and three centuries later on a large scale by Roman engineers.
- Central heating: The Temple of Artemis at Ephesus was warmed by heated air that was circulated through flues laid in the floor, the first known central heating system. Central heating of buildings was later employed throughout the Greek world.
- Cetology: Observations about Cetacea have been recorded since at least classical times. Ancient Greek fishermen created an artificial notch on the dorsal fin of dolphins entangled in nets so that they could tell them apart years later.
- Chain drive: First described by Philo of Byzantium, the device powered a repeating crossbow, the first known of its kind.
- Cheesecake: The earliest attested mention of a cheesecake is by the Greek physician Aegimus who wrote a book on the art of making cheesecakes.
- Chelys: a stringed musical instrument, the common lyre of the ancient Greeks, which had a convex back of tortoiseshell or of wood shaped like the shell. The word chelys was used in allusion to the oldest lyre of the Greeks, which was said to have been invented by Hermes. According to the Homeric Hymn to Hermes, he came across a tortoise near the threshold of his mother's home and decided to hollow out the shell to make the soundbox of an instrument with seven strings.
- Chiton (costume): A chiton is a form of tunic that fastens at the shoulder, worn by men and women of Ancient Greece and Rome.
- Chryselephantine sculpture: sculpture made with gold and ivory. Chryselephantine cult statues enjoyed high status in Ancient Greece.
- Cithara: An ancient Greek musical instrument in the yoke lutes family. In modern Greek the word kithara has come to mean "guitar", a word which etymologically stems from kithara. The kithara was a seven-stringed professional version of the lyre, which was regarded as a rustic, or folk instrument, appropriate for teaching music to beginners. As opposed to the simpler lyre, the kithara was primarily used by professional musicians, called kitharodes. The kithara's origins are likely Anatolian. Popular in the eastern Aegean and ancient Anatolia.
- Classical kemençe: it was mainly used by Greek immigrants from Asia Minor and in classical Ottoman music.
- Claw of Archimedes: An ancient weapon devised by Archimedes to defend the seaward portion of Syracuse's city wall against amphibious assault. Although its exact nature is unclear, the accounts of ancient historians seem to describe it as a sort of crane equipped with a grappling hook that was able to lift an attacking ship partly out of the water, then either cause the ship to capsize or suddenly drop it. It was dropped onto enemy ships, which would then swing itself and destroy the ship.
- Climatology: The Greeks began the formal study of climate; in fact the word climate is derived from the Greek word klima, meaning "slope," referring to the slope or inclination of the Earth's axis. Arguably the most influential classic text on climate was On Airs, Water and Places written by Hippocrates.
- Clock tower: See Clock tower.
- Cochilia: Greek traditional auxiliary percussion instrument.
- Communism: according to Richard Pipes, the idea of a classless, egalitarian society first emerged in Ancient Greece; since the 20th century, Ancient Rome has also been discussed, among them thinkers such as Aristotle, Cicero, Demosthenes, Plato, and Tacitus, with Plato in particular being discussed as a possible communist or socialist theorist, or as the first author to give communism a serious consideration.
- The Athenian Constitution: The Constitution of the Athenians (in ancient Greek Ἀθηναίων πολιτεία, Athenaion Politeia) describes the political system of ancient Athens. According to ancient sources, Aristotle compiled constitutions of 158 Greek states, of which the Constitution of the Athenians is the only one to survive intact. Modern scholars dispute how much of the authorship of these constitutions can be attributed to Aristotle personally; he at least would have been assisted by his students.
- Corinthian order: The Corinthian order is the last developed of the three principal classical orders of ancient Greek and Roman architecture this style of Architecture was mostly invented in Athens based on its other city state Corinth.
- Compound Pulley: Archimedes of Syracuse invented the first compound pulleys.
- Counterweight mirror: Ctesibius' first invention was a counter-weighted mirror.
- Counterweight trebuchet: The earliest written record of the counterweight trebuchet, a vastly more powerful design than the simple traction trebuchet, appears in the work of the 12th-century historian Niketas Choniates. Niketas describes a stone projector used by future emperor Andronikos I Komnenos at the siege of Zevgminon in 1165. This was equipped with a windlass, an apparatus required neither for the traction nor hybrid trebuchet to launch missiles.
- Crane (machine): Labor-saving device that allowed the employment of small and efficient work teams on construction sites. Later winches were added for heavy weights.
- Cretan lyra: Greek pear-shaped, three-stringed bowed musical instrument, central to the traditional music of Crete and other islands in the Dodecanese and the Aegean Archipelago, in Greece.
- Crotalum: ancient Greek clappers or castanets.
- Curtain: Oldest curtains found in excavation sites at Olynthus, Greece.
- Cybernetics: Ctesibius and others such as Heron are considered to be some of the first to study cybernetic principles.

=== D ===
- Democracy: Led by Cleisthenes, Athenians established what is generally held as the first democracy in 508–507 BC. Cleisthenes is referred to as "the father of Athenian democracy."
- Differential gear: The Antikythera mechanism, from the Roman-era Antikythera wreck, employed a differential gear to determine the angle between the ecliptic positions of the sun and moon, and thus the phase of the moon.
- Disability ramp: Oldest disability ramp found in Greece for people with trouble walking.
- Discus throw: The sport of throwing the discus traces back to it being an event in the original Olympic Games of Ancient Greece.
- Doric order: The Doric order was one of the three orders of ancient Greek architecture.
- Double-action principal: Universal mechanical principle that was discovered and first applied by the engineer Ctesibius in his double action piston pump, which was later developed further by Heron to a fire hose.
- Dry dock: Invented in Ptolemaic Egypt, under Ptolemy IV Philopator.

=== E ===
- Ecology: Ancient Greek philosophers such as Hippocrates and Aristotle were among the first to record observations on natural history. However, they viewed life in terms of essentialism. Early conceptions of ecology, such as a balance and regulation in nature can be traced to Herodotus, who described one of the earliest accounts of mutualism in his observation of "natural dentistry".
- Elevator: The earliest known reference to an elevator is in the works of the Roman architect Vitruvius, who reported that Archimedes built his first elevator.
- Elements: The concept of an "element" as an indivisible substance has developed through three major historical phases: Classical definitions (such as those of the ancient Greeks), chemical definitions, and atomic definitions. The term 'elements' (stoicheia) was first used by the Greek philosopher Plato in about 360 BCE in his dialogue Timaeus, which includes a discussion of the composition of inorganic and organic bodies and is a speculative treatise on chemistry. Plato believed the elements introduced a century earlier by Empedocles were composed of small polyhedral forms: tetrahedron (fire), octahedron (air), icosahedron (water), and cube (earth).
- Emotions: the earliest works on how to deal with the feelings of emotions are by the Greek philosophers Aristotle and Plato.
- Epicyclic gearing: around 500 BC, the Greeks invented the idea of epicycles, of circles travelling on the circular orbits. The Antikythera Mechanism, circa 80 BCE, had gearing which was able to closely match the moon's elliptical path through the heavens, and even to correct for the nine-year precession of that path.
- Epidemiology: The Greek physician Hippocrates, known as the father of medicine, sought a logic to sickness; he is the first person known to have examined the relationships between the occurrence of disease and environmental influences.
- Epi-LASIK eye surgery: Greek ophthalmologist Ioannis Pallikaris, who was the first person to perform LASIK eye surgery in 1989, developed the improved epi-LASIK technique at the University of Crete.
- Episteme: is knowledge or understanding. The term epistemology (the branch of philosophy concerning knowledge) is derived from episteme or Science.
- Episkyros: a ball game invented in Greece. Considered to be the earliest ancestor of modern-day Association football.
- Escapement: Described by the Greek engineer Philo of Byzantium (3rd century BC) in his technical treatise Pneumatics (chapter 31) as part of a washstand automaton for guests washing their hands. Philon's comment that "its construction is similar to that of clocks" indicates that such escapement mechanisms were already integrated in ancient water clocks.
- Ethics: branch of philosophy that begins with the Greek Sophists of the fifth century BC.
- Evidence-based medicine: The Greek medical schools at Knidos and Kos were the first to develop rational theories of disease disconnected from religion and superstition and advocate healing based on empirically verified cures.

=== F ===
- Fire hose: invented by Heron in the basis of Ctesibius' double action piston pump. Allowed for more efficient fire fighting.
- Fire pump: an early device used to squirt water onto a fire was known as a squirt or fire syringe. Hand squirts and hand pumps are noted before Ctesibius of Alexandria invented the first fire pump around the 2nd century B.C.
- Flamethrower: Greek fire, heated in a brazier and pressurized by means of a pump, was ejected by an operator through a siphon in any direction against the enemy. Alternatively, it could be poured down from swivel cranes or hurled in pottery grenades.
- Floghera: type of flute used in Greek folk music.
- Flushable pedestal toilets: the 2nd millennium BC the Minoans developed flushable pedestal toilets, with examples excavated at Knossos and Akrotiri.
- Flying machine: as only described in the writings of Aulus Gellius five centuries after him, he was reputed to have designed and built the first artificial, self-propelled flying device, a bird-shaped model propelled by a jet of what was probably steam, said to have actually flown some 200 meters.
- Fore-and-aft rig: Spritsails, the earliest fore-and-aft rigs, appeared in the 2nd century BC in the Aegean Sea on small Greek craft.
- Football: The oldest sport that resembles modern Association football is the ancient Greek ball game, Episkyros which is dated before the 9th century BC.
- Frappé coffee: The Greek version of café frappé, using instant coffee, was invented in 1957 at the Thessaloniki International Fair.

=== G ===
- Gastraphetes: hand-held crossbow used by the Greeks.
- Geography: Building on the mapmaking practices of the Near East, the philosopher Anaximander, a student of Thales, was the first known person to produce a scale map of the known world, while some decades later Hecataeus of Miletus was the first to combine map-making with vivid descriptions of the people and landscapes of each location, taken from interviews with sailors and other travellers, initiating a field of study which Eratosthenes later named γεωγραφία (geography).
- Geology: The study of the physical material of the Earth dates back at least to ancient Greece when Theophrastus wrote the work Peri Lithon (On Stones).
- Geomorphology: The study of landforms and the evolution of the Earth's surface can be dated back to scholars of Classical Greece. Herodotus argued from observations of soils that the Nile delta was actively growing into the Mediterranean Sea, and estimated its age. Aristotle speculated that due to sediment transport into the sea, eventually those seas would fill while the land lowered. He claimed that this would mean that land and water would eventually swap places, whereupon the process would begin again in an endless cycle.
- Gimbal: The inventor Philo of Byzantium described an eight-sided ink pot with an opening on each side, which can be turned so that any face is on top, dip in a pen and ink it-yet the ink never runs out through the holes of the side. This was done by the suspension of the inkwell at the center, which was mounted on a series of concentric metal rings which remained stationary no matter which way the pot turns itself.
- Glasses: The precursor of glasses are the visual aid devices of ancient Greece. Scattered evidence exists for use of visual aid devices in Greek and Roman times, most prominently the use of an emerald by emperor Nero as mentioned by Pliny the Elder.
- Globe: The earliest known example is the one constructed by Greek grammarian Crates of Mallus in Cilicia (now Çukurova in modern-day Turkey), in the mid-2nd century BC.
- Government: The word government derives from the Greek verb κυβερνάω [kubernáo] meaning to steer with a gubernaculum (rudder), the metaphorical sense being attested in the literature of classical antiquity, including Plato's Ship of State. Plato in his book The Republic (375 BC) divided governments into five basic types (four being existing forms and one being Plato's ideal form, which exists "only in speech").
- Greek fire: Greek fire was an incendiary weapon used by the Eastern Roman (Byzantine) Empire that was first developed c. 672. The Byzantines typically used it in naval battles to great effect, as it could continue burning while floating on water.
- Greek wrestling: Type of wrestling. The most popular organized sport in Ancient Greece.
- Gristmill: The Greek geographer Strabo reports in his Geography a water-powered grain-mill to have existed near the palace of king Mithradates VI Eupator at Cabira, Asia Minor, before 71 BC.
- Gymnastics: a sport that includes physical exercises requiring balance, strength, flexibility, agility, coordination, dedication and endurance. The movements involved in gymnastics contribute to the development of the arms, legs, shoulders, back, chest, and abdominal muscle groups. Gymnastics evolved from exercises used in ancient Greece, more specifically in Sparta and Athens.
- Gyro: Greek dish made from meat cooked on a vertical rotisserie. Like shawarma and al pastor meat, it is derived from the lamb-based doner kebab.

=== H ===
- Hand trebuchet: The hand-trebuchet (cheiromangana) was a staff sling mounted on a pole using a lever mechanism to propel projectiles. Basically a portable trebuchet which could be operated by a single man, it was advocated by emperor Nikephoros II Phokas around 965 to disrupt enemy formations in the open field. It was also mentioned in the Taktika of general Nikephoros Ouranos (ca. 1000), and listed in the Anonymus De obsidione toleranda as a form of artillery.
- Hawaiian pizza: Sam Panopoulos, a Greek immigrant who moved to Canada invented the Hawaiian pizza in 1962.
- Headband: The beginning of headbands was no later than around 475 BC to 330 BC, with the ancient Greeks, who wore hair wreaths.
- Helepolis: Greek siege tower.
- Heron's fountain: Heron's fountain is a hydraulic machine invented by the 1st century AD inventor, mathematician, and physicist Heron of Alexandria.
- Himation: A himation was a type of clothing, a mantle or wrap worn by ancient Greek men and women from the Archaic through the Hellenistic periods.
- Historiography: The earliest chronologies date back to Mesopotamia and ancient Egypt, in the form of chronicles and annals. By contrast, the term "historiography" is taken to refer to written history recorded in a narrative format for the purpose of informing future generations about events. In this limited sense, "history" begins with the early historiography of Classical Antiquity, in about the 5th century BCE, with Herodotus, the father of history.
- Holography: The word holography comes from the Greek words ὅλος (holos; "whole") and γραφή (graphē; "writing" or "drawing").
- Humanism: a philosophical school of thought that emphasizes the individual and social potential and agency of human beings. It considers human beings the starting point for serious moral and philosophical inquiry. Traces of humanism can be traced in the ancient Greek philosophy. Pre-Socratics philosophers were the first Western philosophers to attempt to explain the world in terms of human reason and natural law without relying on myth, tradition, or religion. Protagoras, an Athenian philosopher and sophist, put forward some fundamental humanist ideas.
- Humanities: the history of the humanities can be traced to ancient Greece, as the basis of a broad education for citizens. The Classical Greek paideia, a course of general education dating from the Sophists in the mid-5th century BCE, which prepared young men for active citizenship in the polis, or city-state.
- Hydrometer: the hydrometer dates to Archimedes who used its principles to find the density of various liquids.
- Hypodermic needle: the ancient Greeks and Romans knew injection as a method of medicinal delivery from observations of snakebites and poisoned weapons.

=== I ===
- Ionic order: The Ionic order is one of the three orders of ancient Greek architecture.

=== J ===
- Javelin throw: The javelin throw was added to the Ancient Olympic Games as part of the pentathlon in 708 BC. It included two events, one for distance and the other for accuracy in hitting a target.
- Jury trial: Ancient Athens had a mechanism, called dikastaí, to assure that no one could select jurors for their own trial. For normal cases, the courts were made up of dikastai of up to 500 citizens. For capital cases—those that involved death, loss of liberty, exile, loss of civil rights, or seizure of property—the trial was before a jury of 1,001 to 1,501 dikastai. In such large juries, they rule by majority. Juries were appointed by lot. Jurists cast a ceramic disk with an axle in its middle: the axle was either hollow or solid. Thus the way they voted was kept secret because the jurists would hold their disk by the axle by thumb and forefinger, thus hiding whether its axle was hollow or solid. Since Periclean times, jurists were compensated for their sitting in court, with the amount of one day's wages. The institution of trial by jury was ritually depicted by Aeschylus in The Eumenides, the third and final play of his Oresteia trilogy. In the play, the innovation is brought about by the goddess Athena, who summons twelve citizens to sit as jury. The god Apollo takes part in the trial as the advocate for the defendant Orestes and the Furies as prosecutors for the slain Clytemnestra. In the event the jury is split six to six, Athena dictates that the verdict should henceforth be for acquittal.

=== L ===
- Laboratory: the earliest laboratory according to the present evidence is a home laboratory of Pythagoras of Samos, the well-known Greek philosopher and scientist. This laboratory was created when Pythagoras conducted an experiment about tones of sound and vibration of string.
- Laouto: a long-neck fretted instrument of the lute (hence the name) family, found in Greece and Cyprus.
- Liberalism: isolated strands of liberal thought have existed in Western philosophy since the Ancient Greeks.
- Library: Private or personal libraries made up of written books appeared in classical Greece in the 5th century BC.
- Logic: Logic comes from the Greek word logos, originally meaning "the word" or "what is spoken", but coming to mean "thought" or "reason". In the Western World, logic was first developed by Aristotle, who called the subject 'analytics'.
- Laïko: Greek music genre composed in Greek language in accordance with the tradition of the Greek people.
- Lead sheathing: To protect a ship's hull from many creatures. See Kyrenia ship.
- Libor: The London Inter-bank Offered Rate interest rate benchmark was devised by Greek banker Minos Zombanakis.
- Lighthouse: According to Homeric legend, Palamidis of Nafplio invented the first lighthouse, although they are certainly attested with the Lighthouse of Alexandria (designed and constructed by Sostratus of Cnidus) and the Colossus of Rhodes. However, Themistocles had earlier established a lighthouse at the harbor of Piraeus connected to Athens in the 5th century BC, essentially a small stone column with a fire beacon.
- Lyric poetry: First written in the form of Greek lyric.

=== M ===
- Macedonian lyra: Greek pear-shaped, three-stringed bowed musical instrument, used mainly in the Greek folk music of the Greek region of Macedonia (Greece), and especially in the region of Drama, usually accompanied by violin.
- Marathon: The name Marathon comes from the legend of Philippides (or Pheidippides), the Greek messenger. The legend states that, while he was taking part in the battle of Marathon, he witnessed a Persian vessel changing its course towards Athens as the battle was near a victorious end for the Greek army.
- Marine biology: The study of marine biology dates back to Aristotle, who made many observations of life in the sea around Lesbos, laying the foundation for many future discoveries.
- Market economy: market interdependence and integration first developed along the Aegean coast.
- Mastic gum: the ancient Greeks chewed mastic gum, made from the resin of the mastic tree.
- Mathematics: Archimedes is considered the father of mathematics because of his notable inventions in mathematics and science. He was in the service of King Hiero II of Syracuse.
- Mathematical mechanics: Archytas is believed to be the founder of mathematical mechanics.
- Meteorology: The word meteorology is from the Ancient Greek μετέωρος metéōros (meteor) and -λογία -logia (-(o)logy), meaning "the study of things high in the air". In (Meteorologica or Meteora) is a treatise by Aristotle. The text discusses what Aristotle believed to have been all the affections common to air and water, and the kinds and parts of the Earth and the affections of its parts. It includes early accounts of water evaporation, earthquakes, and other weather phenomena.
- Metaxa: Metaxa is a Greek spirit invented by Spyros Metaxas in 1888. It is exported to over 65 countries and it is among the 100 strongest spirit brands worldwide.
- Mini: This distinctive two-door car was designed for the British Motor Corporation by Greek engineer Sir Alec Issigonis. His grandfather Demosthenis migrated to Smyrna from Paros in Greece in the 1830s and through the work he did for the British-built Smyrna-Aydın Railway.
- Morphology: Concept of form in biology, opposed to function, dates back to Aristotle.
- Museum: It is originally from the Ancient Greek Μουσεῖον (mouseion), which denotes a place or temple dedicated to the muses (the patron divinities in Greek mythology of the arts), and hence was a building set apart for study and the arts, especially the Musaeum (institute) for philosophy and research at Alexandria, built under Ptolemy I Soter about 280 BC.
- Musical mirror: invented by Ctesibius.
- Musical theatre: The antecedents of musical theatre in Europe can be traced back to the theatre of ancient Greece, where music and dance were included in stage comedies and tragedies during the 5th century BCE.
- Multiverse: The concept of multiple universes, or a multiverse, has been discussed throughout history, including Greek philosophy. It has evolved and has been debated in various fields, including cosmology, physics, and philosophy. Some physicists argue that the multiverse is a philosophical notion rather than a scientific hypothesis, as it cannot be empirically falsified. In recent years, there have been proponents and skeptics of multiverse theories within the physics community. According to some, the idea of infinite worlds was first suggested by the pre-Socratic Greek philosopher Anaximander in the sixth century BCE. However, there is debate as to whether he believed in multiple worlds, and if he did, whether those worlds were co-existent or successive. The first to whom we can definitively attribute the concept of innumerable worlds are the Ancient Greek Atomists, beginning with Leucippus and Democritus in the 5th century BCE, followed by Epicurus (341–270 BCE) and Lucretius (1st century BCE). In the third century BCE, the philosopher Chrysippus suggested that the world eternally expired and regenerated, effectively suggesting the existence of multiple universes across time. The concept of multiple universes became more defined in the Middle Ages.

=== N ===
- Natural history: Natural history begins with Aristotle.
- Navy: the Minoan civilization is known to have the first navy. They built a powerful and long-lasting civilization based on a strong navy and trade throughout the Mediterranean Sea.
- Neuroscience: In Ancient Greece, interest in the brain began with the work of Alcmaeon, who appeared to have dissected the eye and related the brain to vision. He also suggested that the brain, not the heart, was the organ that ruled the body (what Stoics would call the hegemonikon) and that the senses were dependent on the brain. According to ancient authorities, Alcmaeon believed the power of the brain to synthesize sensations made it also the seat of memories and thought. The author of On the Sacred Disease, part of the Hippocratic corpus, likewise believed the brain to be the seat of intelligence. The debate regarding the hegemonikon persisted among ancient Greek philosophers and physicians for a very long time. Already in the 4th century BC, Aristotle thought that the heart was the seat of intelligence, while the brain was a cooling mechanism for the blood. He reasoned that humans are more rational than the beasts because, among other reasons, they have a larger brain to cool their hot-bloodedness. On the opposite end, during the Hellenistic period, Herophilus and Erasistratus of Alexandria engaged in studies that involved dissecting human bodies, providing evidence for the primacy of the brain. They affirmed the distinction between the cerebrum and the cerebellum, and identifying the ventricles and the dura mater. Their works are now mostly lost, and we know about their achievements due mostly to secondary sources. Some of their discoveries had to be re-discovered a millennium after their death. During the Roman Empire, the Greek physician and philosopher Galen dissected the brains of oxen, Barbary apes, swine, and other non-human mammals. He concluded that, as the cerebellum was denser than the brain, it must control the muscles, while as the cerebrum was soft, it must be where the senses were processed. Galen further theorized that the brain functioned by the movement of animal spirits through the ventricles. He also noted that specific spinal nerves controlled specific muscles, and had the idea of the reciprocal action of muscles. Only in the 19th century, in the work of François Magendie and Charles Bell, would the understanding of spinal function surpass that of Galen.
- Non-stick surface: Scientific research reveals that the ancient Mycenaean's, more than 3,000 years ago used portable grilling trays for making souvlaki and non-stick pans for baking bread.
- Novel: the earliest novels include classical Greek and Latin prose narratives from the first century BC to the second century AD, such as Chariton's Callirhoe (mid 1st century), which is "arguably the earliest surviving Western novel."

=== O ===
- Odometer: Odometer, a device used in the late Hellenistic time and by Romans for indicating the distance travelled by a vehicle. It was invented sometime in the 3rd century BC. Some historians attribute it to Archimedes, others to Heron of Alexandria. It helped revolutionize the building of roads and travelling by them by accurately measuring distance and being able to carefully illustrate this with a milestone.
- Optical telegraph: In the 9th century, during the Arab–Byzantine wars, the Byzantine Empire used a system of beacons to transmit messages from the border with the Abbasid Caliphate across Asia Minor to the Byzantine capital, Constantinople.The main line of beacons stretched over some 450 miles (720 km). In the open spaces of central Asia Minor, the stations were placed over 60 miles (97 km) apart, while in Bithynia, with its more broken terrain, the intervals were reduced to ca. 35 miles (56 km). Based on modern experiments, a message could be transmitted the entire length of the line within an hour. The system was reportedly devised in the reign of Emperor Theophilos (ruled 829–842) by Leo the Mathematician, and functioned through two identical water clocks placed at the two terminal stations, Loulon and the Lighthouse. Different messages were assigned to each of twelve hours, so that the lighting of a bonfire on the first beacon on a particular hour signalled a specific event and was transmitted down the line to Constantinople.
- Olympic Games: The ancient Olympic Games (Ὀλυμπιακοὶ ἀγῶνες; Latin: Olympia, neuter plural: "the Olympics") were a series of athletic competitions among representatives of city-states and one of the Panhellenic Games of Ancient Greece.
- Orrery: the Antikythera mechanism, discovered in 1901 in a wreck off the Greek island of Antikythera and extensively studied, exhibited the diurnal motions of the Sun, Moon, and the five known planets.

=== P ===
- Pan flute: In Greek mythology, Syrinx (Σύριγξ) was a forest Nymph. In her attempt to escape the affection of god Pan (a creature half goat and half man), she was transformed into a water-reed or calamos (cane-reed). Then, Pan cut several reeds, placed them in parallel one next to the other, and bound them together to make a melodic musical instrument. Ancient Greeks called this instrument Syrinx, in honour of the Muse, and Pandean, or Pan-pipes and Pan-flute, after Pan.
- Pankration: The mainstream academic view has been that pankration developed in the archaic Greek society of the 7th century BC, whereby, as the need for expression in violent sport increased, pankration filled a niche of "total contest" that neither boxing nor wrestling could. However, some evidence suggests that pankration, in both its sporting form and its combative form, may have been practiced in Greece already from the second millennium BC.
- Pantograph: Hero of Alexandria first described pantographs in his work Mechanics.
- Paleontology: The ancient Greek philosopher Xenophanes concluded from fossil sea shells that some areas of land were once under water.
- Pap smear: he test was invented by and named after the Greek doctor Georgios Papanikolaou, who started his research in 1923.
- Pap test: A test for cervical cancer developed by the Greek physician George Papanikolaou in 1923.
- Pediment: Architectural element found particularly in Classical, Neoclassical and Baroque architecture, and its derivatives, consisting of a gable, usually of a triangular shape, placed above the horizontal structure of the lintel, or entablature, if supported by columns. The tympanum, the triangular area within the pediment, is often decorated with relief sculpture. A pediment is sometimes the top element of a portico. For symmetric designs, it provides a centre point and is often used to add grandness to entrances.
- Pentathlon: The first documented pentathlon occurred in 708 BC in Ancient Greece at the Ancient Olympic Games, and was also held at the other Panhellenic Games.
- Peplos: A peplos is a body-length garment established as typical attire for women in ancient Greece by 500 BC.
- Personal table fork: Although its origin may go back to Ancient Greece, the personal table fork was most likely invented in the Eastern Roman (Byzantine) Empire, where they were in common use by the 4th century.
- Physical therapy: Physicians like Hippocrates and later Galen are believed to have been the first practitioners of physical therapy, advocating massage, manual therapy techniques and hydrotherapy to treat people in 460 BC.
- Physiology: The study of human physiology as a medical field originates in classical Greece, at the time of Hippocrates.
- Pilates: A physical fitness system developed in the early 20th century by Joseph Pilates, after whom it was named. Pilates called his method "Contrology" and it is practiced worldwide. Pilates was a German physical trainer of Greek descent.
- Pipe organ: the Greek engineer Ctesibius of Alexandria is credited with inventing the organ in the 3rd century BC.
- Piston pump: invented by Ctesibius.
- Planetary science: the history of planetary science may be said to have begun with the Ancient Greek philosopher Democritus.
- Pneumatics: the origins of pneumatics can be traced back to the first century when ancient Hero of Alexandria wrote about his inventions powered by steam or the wind.
- Pointed arch bridge: The earliest known bridge resting on a pointed arch is the 5th or 6th century AD Karamagara Bridge in Cappadocia. Its single arch of 17 m spanned an affluent of the Euphrates. A Greek inscription, citing from the Bible, runs along one side of its arch rib. The structure is today submerged by the Keban Reservoir.
- Political science: As a social political science, contemporary political science started to take shape in the latter half of the 19th century. At that time it began to separate itself from political philosophy, which traces its roots back to the works of Aristotle and Plato.
- Psychology: The work of ancient Greek philosophers like Aristotle and Plato explored topics such as memory, perception, and learning, which influenced the development of modern psychology.

=== R ===
- Railway: The 6 to 8.5 km long Diolkos represented a rudimentary form of railway.
- Rebetiko: term used today to designate originally disparate kinds of urban Greek music which have come to be grouped together since the so-called rebetika revival, which started in the 1960s and developed further from the early 1970s onwards.
- Red-figure pottery: one of the most important styles of figural Greek vase painting.
- Rule of Law: Several scholars have also traced the concept of the rule of law back to 4th-century BC Athens, seeing it either as the dominant value of the Athenian democracy, or as one held in conjunction with the concept of popular sovereignty. However, these arguments have been challenged and the present consensus is that upholding an abstract concept of the rule of law was not "the predominant consideration" of the Athenian legal system. Aristotle, in his Politics, wrote: "It is more proper that law should govern than any one of the citizens: upon the same principle, if it is advantageous to place the supreme power in some particular persons, they should be appointed to be only guardians, and the servants of the laws." The idea of the rule of law can be regarded as a modern iteration of the ideas of ancient Greek philosophers, who argued that the best form of government was rule by the best men. Plato advocated a benevolent monarchy ruled by an idealized philosopher king, who was above the law. Plato nevertheless hoped that the best men would be good at respecting established laws, explaining that "Where the law is subject to some other authority and has none of its own, the collapse of the state, in my view, is not far off; but if law is the master of the government and the government is its slave, then the situation is full of promise and men enjoy all the blessings that the gods shower on a state." In contrast, Aristotle flatly opposed letting the highest officials wield power beyond guarding and serving the laws. In other words, Aristotle advocated the rule of law.

=== S ===
- Salpinx: Ancient Greek trumpet-like instrument.
- Sawmill: The earliest known mechanical mill is the Hierapolis sawmill, a Roman water-powered stone mill in the Greek city of Hierapolis.
- Separation of powers: Aristotle first mentioned the idea of a "mixed government" or hybrid government in his work Politics, where he drew upon many of the constitutional forms in the city-states of Ancient Greece.
- Sewers: The Minoan civilization of Crete built an advanced underground sewer system that included flushed toilets and stone sewers. The capital of the ancient Greek kingdom of Macedon, Pella had a sophisticated water supply and sewerage system.
- Science fiction: Written in the 2nd century CE by the satirist Lucian, A True Story contains many themes and tropes characteristic of modern science fiction, including travel to other worlds, extraterrestrial lifeforms, interplanetary warfare, and artificial life. Some consider it the first science fiction novel.
- Screw: the screw was first described by Archytas.
- Screw press: the screw press, probably invented in Greece in the 1st or 2nd century BC, has been used since the days of the Roman Empire for pressing clothes.
- Shower: The Ancient Greeks were the first known people to have showers, which were connected to their lead pipe plumbing system. A shower room for female athletes with plumbed-in water is depicted on an Athenian vase. A whole complex of shower-baths was also found in a 2nd-century BC gymnasium at Pergamum.
- Socialism: scholars have suggested that elements of socialist thought were present in the politics of classical Greek philosophers Plato and Aristotle.
- Sociology: The sociological reasoning may be traced back at least as far as the ancient Greeks. Social analysis has origins in the common stock of Western knowledge and philosophy and ancient Greek philosophers Socrates, Plato, and Aristotle.
- Souvlaki: Excavations in Santorini, Greece, unearthed sets of stone cooking supports used before the 17th century BC. In the supports there are pairs of indentations that were likely used for holding skewers. The line of holes in the base allowed the coals to be supplied with oxygen.
- Spiral staircase: The earliest spiral staircases appear in Temple A in Selinunte, Sicily, to both sides of the cella. The temple was constructed around 480–470 BC.
- Speculum: vaginal and anal specula were used by the ancient Greeks, and speculum artifacts have been found in Pompeii.
- Sponge (tool): the first references of sponges used for hygiene dates from ancient Greeks.
- Stadium: the oldest known stadium is the Stadium at Olympia in Greece, where the ancient Olympic Games were held from 776 BC. Initially the Games consisted of a single event, a sprint along the length of the stadium.
- Steam engine: Archimedes invented the first steam-powered device however, Hero of Alexandria designed the Aeolipile. The aeolipile is a simple bladeless radial steam turbine which spins when the central water container is heated. Torque is produced by steam jets exiting the turbine, much like a tip jet. Hero of Alexandria first described the aeolipile in the 1st century AD and many sources give him the credit for its invention.
- Steam-powered device: Archimedes invented the first steam-powered device with the Steam cannon.
- Stoa: In ancient Greek architecture, is a covered walkway or portico, commonly for public use. Early stoas were open at the entrance with columns, usually of the Doric order, lining the side of the building; they created a safe, enveloping, protective atmosphere.
- Streets: Example: The Porta Rosa (4th–3rd century BC) was the main street of Elea (Italy) and connected the northern quarter to the southern quarter. The street is 5 meters wide. At its steepest, it has an inclination of 18%. It is paved with limestone blocks, grinders cut in square blocks, and on one side a small gutter for the drainage of rain water. The building is dated during the time of the reorganization of the city during Hellenistic age.
- Syringe: First mentioned by Greek and Roman authors.

=== T ===
- Thaboura: a type of a string instrument, evolved from the Greek musical instrument tambouras. It is bigger than tambouras and it has 3 strings or 3 pairs of strings. The thaboura's history stretches back to the Byzantine culture and originated in the medieval Greece times.
- Thalassocracy: the Minoan civilization was the first thalassocracy. The ancient Greeks first used the word thalassocracy to describe the government of the Minoan civilization, whose power depended on its navy.
- Theatre: Theatre, in its modern sense, involving the performance of pre-written tragic, dramatic and comedic plays for an audience, first originated in Classical Athens in the 6th century BC.
- Theatre in the round: Theatre-in-the-round was common in ancient theatre, particularly that of Greece and Rome, but was not widely explored again until the latter half of the 20th century.
- Three-masted ship: First recorded for Syracusia as well as other Syracusan (merchant) ships under Hiero II of Syracuse.
- Thermometer: various authors have credited the invention of the thermometer to Hero.
- Thesaurus: In antiquity, Philo of Byblos authored the first text that could now be called a thesaurus.
- Tholos: A tholos (pl.: tholoi; from Ancient Greek θόλος, meaning "conical roof" or "dome"), is a form of building that was widely used in the classical world. It is a round structure with a circular wall and a roof, usually built upon a couple of steps (a podium), and often with a ring of columns supporting a conical or domed roof.
- Torsion siege engine: Preceding the development of torsion siege engines were tension siege engines that had existed since at least the beginning of the 4th century BC, most notably the gastraphetes in Heron of Alexandria's Belopoeica that was probably invented in Syracuse by Dionysius the Elder. Simple Torsion devices could have been developed earlier, the first extant evidence of a torsion siege engine comes from the Chalcotheca, the arsenal on the Acropolis in Athens, and dates to c. 338 – 326 BC. It lists the building's inventory that included torsion catapults and its components such as hair springs, catapult bases, and bolts.
- Toubeleki: Greek traditional drum musical instrument.
- Toxicology: Dioscorides, a Greek physician in the court of the Roman emperor Nero, made the first attempt to classify plants according to their toxic and therapeutic effect.
- Trigonometry:The first-known trigonometric table was apparently compiled by Hipparchus of Nicaea (180 – 125 BC), who is now consequently known as "the father of trigonometry."
- Truss roof: See List of Greco-Roman roofs.
- Tsampouna: Greek musical instrument and part of the bagpipe family. It is a double-chantered bagpipe, with no drone, and is inflated by blowing by mouth into a goatskin bag. The instrument is widespread in the Greek islands.
- Tsipouro: The first production of tsipouro was the work of Greek Orthodox monks in the 14th century on Mount Athos in Macedonia, Greece.
- Tympanum: Ancient Greek frame drum.
- Tzatziki: Greek dip, soup, or sauce found in the cuisines of Southeast Europe and the Middle East. It is made of salted strained yogurt or diluted yogurt mixed with cucumbers, garlic, salt, olive oil, sometimes with vinegar or lemon juice, and herbs such as dill, mint, parsley and thyme.
- Tzouras: Greek stringed musical instrument.

=== V ===
- Vending machine: The first vending machine was described by Heron of Alexandria. His machine accepted a coin and then dispensed a fixed amount of holy water. When the coin was deposited, it fell upon a pan attached to a lever. The lever opened up a valve, which let some water flow out. The pan continued to tilt with the weight of the coin until it fell off, at which point a counter-weight would snap the lever back up and turn off the valve.

=== W ===
- Watermill: The use of water power was pioneered by the Greeks: The earliest mention of a water mill in history occurs in Philo's Pneumatics. The technological breakthrough occurred in the technically advanced and scientifically minded Hellenistic period between the 3rd and 1st century BC
- Water organ: The water organ or hydraulic organ (hydraulis) was an early type of pipe organ driven by water, the world's earliest keyboard instrument, and the predecessor of the modern pipe organ, whose invention was attributed to 3rd century BC Hellenistic engineer, Ctesibius of Alexandria.
- Wheelbarrow: The history of the wheelbarrow began in Greece circa 406 BC. However, there are no records that indicate who actually made it.
- Winch: The earliest literary reference to a winch can be found in the account of Herodotus of Halicarnassus on the Persian Wars (Histories 7.36), where he describes how wooden winches were used to tighten the cables for a pontoon bridge across the Hellespont in 480 BC. Winches may have been employed even earlier in Assyria, though. By the 4th century BC, winch and pulley hoists were regarded by Aristotle as common for architectural use (Mech. 18; 853b10-13).
- Windlass: The Greek scientist Archimedes was the inventor of the windlass.
- Windmill: Hero of Alexandria in first-century Roman Egypt described what appears to be a wind-driven wheel to power a machine. His description of a wind-powered organ is not a practical windmill, but was either an early wind-powered toy, or a design concept for a wind-powered machine.
- Wind vane: The Tower of the Winds on the Roman agora in Athens featured atop a wind vane in the form of a bronze Triton holding a rod in his outstretched hand rotating to the wind blowing. Below, its frieze was adorned with the eight wind deities. The 8 m high structure also featured sundials and a water clock inside dates from around 50 BC.
- Wreath: headdress made of leaves, grasses, flowers or branches first worn in Greece.

== Discoveries made by Greeks ==
=== Astronomy and physics ===
- Equinox: Thales discovered the equinox.
- Gravity: Aristotle believed that objects fell towards the earth because earth is the centre of the universe and attracted all the objects towards it.
- Heliocentrism: The notion that the Earth and planets revolve around the Sun was first proposed by Aristarchus of Samos in the 3rd century BC.
- Solstice: Thales discovered the solstice.
- Atomism: Leucippus, along with his student Democritus, developed the atomic theory and is credited as the founder of atomism.
- Precession of the Earth's axis: Discovered by Hipparchus in 127 BC.

=== Geography ===
- Latitude and Longitude: The invention of a geographic coordinate system is generally credited to Eratosthenes of Cyrene, who composed his now-lost Geography at the Library of Alexandria in the 3rd century BC.

=== Mathematics ===
- Mathematical deduction: Thales of Miletus, considered by Aristotle to be the first Greek philosopher, is thought to be the first individual to apply deductive reasoning to produce mathematical proofs, particularly in the field of geometry
- Thales' theorem: One of the most basic theorems of geometry, stating that whenever an angle is drawn from two ends of the diameter of a circle to any third point on its circumference, the angle formed at the third point is always a perfect right angle. The phenomenon was known empirically to the Babylonians but was first proved in the 6th century BC by Thales of Miletus, making him the first known individual to whom a mathematical discovery has been attributed.
- Intercept theorem: Also attributed to Thales is the fundamental theorem of geometry that states that the ratios of corresponding sides of similar triangles (i.e. triangles formed from the intersection of two common lines with two different parallel lines) are equal. Thales is said to have used his theorem to determine the height of pyramids by measuring the lengths of their shadows.
- Trigonometry:The first-known trigonometric table was apparently compiled by Hipparchus of Nicaea (180 – 125 BC), who is now consequently known as "the father of trigonometry."
- Conic sections: First developed by Menaechmus in the 4th century BC, but the most significant contribution is by Apollonius of Perga in the 3rd century BC.
- Method of exhaustion: Formalized by Eudoxus of Cnidus in the early 4th century BC, used by Archimedes to calculate the value of pi and the area under a curve.
- Mathematical proof: The mathematical proof was a product of Greek mathematics, evolving gradually to reach the method still used today in Euclid's Elements around 300 BC.
- Sieve of Eratosthenes: Developed by Eratosthenes in the 3rd century BC to calculate prime numbers.

=== Philosophy ===
- Socratic method: A form of cooperative argumentative dialogue between individuals, based on asking and answering questions to stimulate critical thinking and to draw out ideas and underlying presuppositions. It is named after the Classical Greek philosopher Socrates and is introduced by him in Plato's Theaetetus as midwifery (maieutics) because it is employed to bring out definitions implicit in the interlocutors' beliefs, or to help them further their understanding.

== See also ==
- Greek mathematics
- Greek astronomy
- Ancient Greek technology
- List of Byzantine inventions

== Bibliography ==
- Boyer, C.B.; Merzbach, Uta (1991). A History of Mathematics (2nd ed.). New York: Wiley. ISBN 0-471-09763-2.
- Foss, Clive. "Beacon". In Kazhdan (1991), pp. 273–274.
- Haldon, John F. (1990). Constantine Porphyrogenitus: Three treatises on imperial military expeditions. Vienna: Verlag der Österreichischen Akademie der Wissenschaften. ISBN 3700117787.
- Kazhdan, Alexander, ed. (1991). The Oxford Dictionary of Byzantium. London and New York: Oxford University Press. ISBN 978-0-19-504652-6.
- Toynbee, Arnold (1973). Constantine Porphyrogenitus and His World. London and New York: Oxford University Press. ISBN 0-19-215253-X.
