= Ancient Greek technology =

Tools and weapons used in Ancient Greece

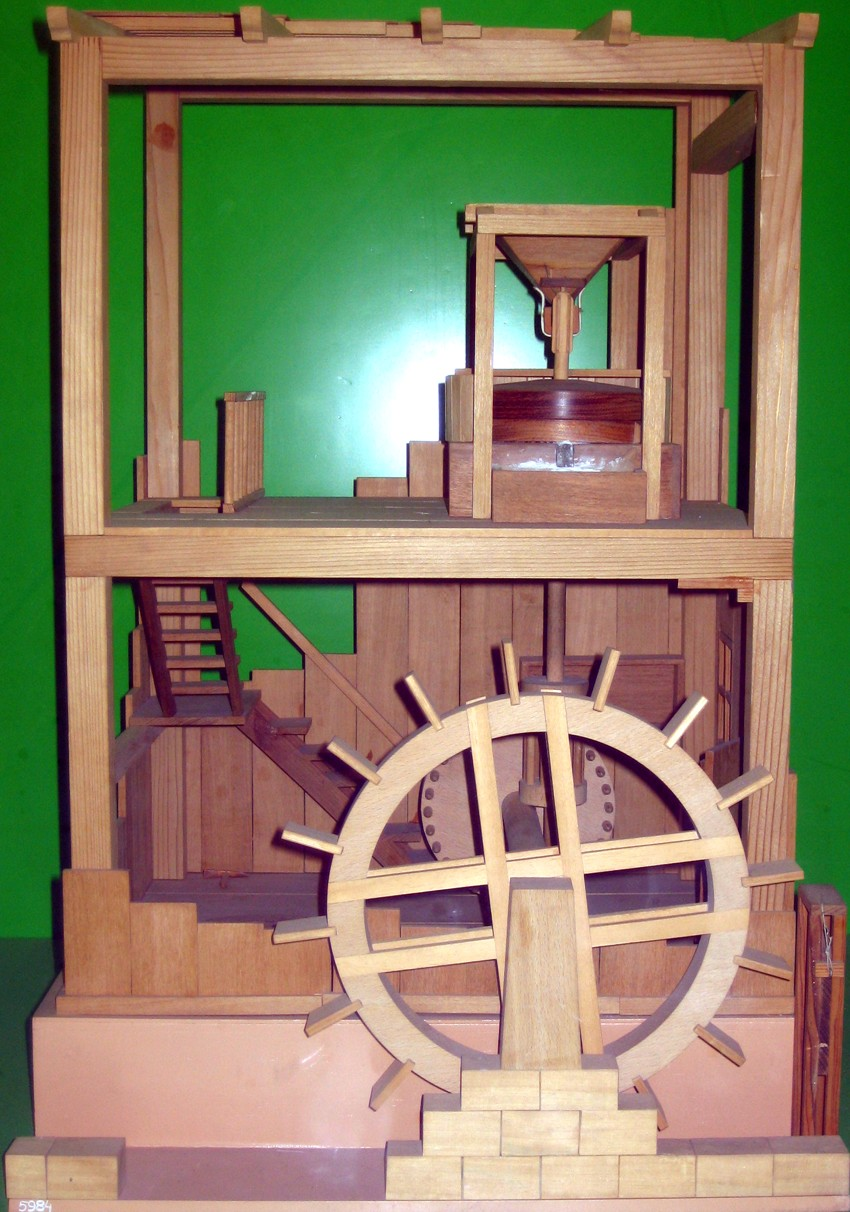
The watermill, as the first machine harnessing natural forces (apart from the sail) and as such holding a special place in the history of technology, was invented by Greek engineers sometime between the 3rd and 1st centuries BC. Here a Roman gristmill as described by Vitruvius.

Ancient Greek technology developed during the 5th century BC, continuing up to and including the Roman period, and beyond. Inventions that are credited to the ancient Greeks include the gear, screw, rotary mills, bronze casting techniques, water clock, water organ, the torsion catapult, the use of steam to operate some experimental machines and toys, and a chart to find prime numbers. Many of these inventions occurred late in the Greek period, often inspired by the need to improve weapons and tactics in war. However, peaceful uses are shown by their early development of the watermill, a device which pointed to further exploitation on a large scale under the Romans. They developed surveying and mathematics to an advanced state, and many of their technical advances were published by philosophers, like Archimedes and Heron.

== Water technology ==
Some fields that were encompassed in the area of water resources (mainly for urban use) included groundwater exploitation, construction of aqueducts for water supply, storm water and wastewater sewerage systems, flood protection, and drainage, construction and use of fountains, baths and other sanitary and purgatory facilities, and even recreational uses of water. Excellent examples of these technologies include the drainage system found in the Anatolian west coast, which featured an unusual masonry outlet structure that allowed self-cleaning of the drainage outlet. The technology, which demonstrated the Greek understanding of the importance of hygienic conditions to public health, was part of an elaborate drainage system and underground water supply network.

== Mining ==
The Greeks developed extensive silver mines at Laurium, the profits from which helped support the growth of Athens as a city-state. It involved mining the ores in underground galleries, washing them, and smelting it to produce the metal. Elaborate washing tables still exist at the site, which used rainwater held in cisterns and collected during the winter months. Mining also helped to create currency by the conversion of the metal into coinage. Greek mines had tunnels that were as deep as 330 feet and were worked by slaves using picks and iron hammers. The extracted ore were lifted by small skips hauled by a rope that was sometimes guided by a wheel placed against the rim of the mine shaft.

== Inventions ==
Technology	Date	Description	
Archimedes' screw	c. 3rd century BC	This device, capable of lifting solid or liquid substances from a lower plane to a higher elevation, is traditionally attributed to the Greek mathematician Archimedes of Syracuse.	
Streets	c. 400 BC	Example: The Porta Rosa (4th–3rd century BC) was the main street of Elea (Italy) and connected the northern quarter to the southern quarter. The street is 5 meters wide. At its steepest, it inclines to 18%. It is paved with limestone blocks, girders cut in square blocks, and on one side a small gutter for the drainage of rainwater. The building is dated during the time of the reorganization of the city during the Hellenistic age. (4th to 3rd centuries BC)	
Cartography	c. 600 BC	First widespread amalgamation of geographical maps developed by Anaximander, although it is possible he had been exposed to mapmaking practices of the Near East.	
Rutway	c. 600 BC	The 6 to 8.5 km long Diolkos represented a rudimentary form of railway.	
Differential gears	c. 100–70 BC	The Antikythera mechanism, from the Roman-era Antikythera wreck, employed a differential gear to determine the angle between the ecliptic positions of the sun and moon, and thus the phase of the moon.	
Caliper	6th century BC	Earliest example found in the Giglio wreck near the Italian coast. The wooden piece already featured one fixed and a movable jaw.	
Truss roof	550 BC	See List of Greco-Roman roofs	
Crane	c. 515 BC	Labor-saving device that allowed the employment of small and efficient work teams on construction sites. Later winches were added for heavy weights.	
Escapement	3rd century BC	Described by the Greek engineer Philo of Byzantium (3rd century BC) in his technical treatise Pneumatics (chapter 31) as part of a washstand automaton for guests washing their hands. Philon's comment that "its construction is similar to that of clocks" indicates that such escapement mechanisms were already integrated in ancient water clocks.	Washstand automaton
Tumbler lock	c. 5th century BC	The tumbler lock, as well as other varieties of lock, was introduced in Greece in the 5th century BC.	
Gears	c. 5th century BC	Developed further than in prehistoric times for a variety of practical purposes.	
Plumbing	c. 5th century BC	Although there is evidence for sanitation in the Indus Valley civilisation, the ancient Greek civilization of Crete, known as the Minoan civilization, was the first civilization to use underground clay pipes for sanitation and water supply. Excavations at Olympus, as well as Athens, have revealed extensive plumbing systems for baths, fountains, and personal use.	
Spiral staircase	480–470 BC	The earliest spiral staircases appear in Temple A in Selinunte, Sicily, to both sides of the cella. The temple was constructed around 480–470 BC.	Plan of ground floor of Temple A at Selinunte (c. 480 BC). The remains of the two spiral stairs between the pronao and the cella are the oldest known to date.
Urban planning	c. 5th century BC	Miletus is one of the first known towns in the world to have a grid-like plan for residential and public areas. It accomplished this feat through a variety of related innovations in areas such as surveying.	
Winch	5th century BC	The earliest literary reference to a winch can be found in the account of Herodotus of Halicarnassus on the Persian Wars (Histories 7.36), where he describes how wooden winches were used to tighten the cables for a pontoon bridge across the Hellespont in 480 BC. Winches may have been employed even earlier in Assyria, though. By the 4th century BC, winch and pulley hoists were regarded by Aristotle as common for architectural use (Mech. 18; 853b10-13).	
Showers	4th century BC	A shower room for female athletes with plumbed-in water is depicted on an Athenian vase. A whole complex of shower-baths was also found in a 2nd-century BC gymnasium at Pergamum.	
Central heating	c. 350 BC	The Great Temple of Ephesus was warmed by heated air that was circulated through flues laid on the floor.	
Lead sheathing	c. 350 BC	To protect a ship's hull from boring creatures; see Kyrenia ship	
Canal lock	early 3rd century BC	Built into Ancient Suez Canal under Ptolemy II (283–246 BC).	
Ancient Suez Canal	early 3rd century BC	Opened by Greek engineers under Ptolemy II (283–246 BC), following earlier, probably only partly successful attempts.	
Lighthouse	c. 3rd century BC	According to Homeric legend, Palamidis of Nafplio invented the first lighthouse, although they are certainly attested with the Lighthouse of Alexandria (designed and constructed by Sostratus of Cnidus) and the Colossus of Rhodes. However, Themistocles had earlier established a lighthouse at the harbor of Piraeus connected to Athens in the 5th century BC, essentially a small stone column with a fire beacon.	
Water wheel	3rd century BC	First described by Philo of Byzantium (c. 280–220 BC).	
Alarm clock	3rd century BC	The Hellenistic engineer and inventor Ctesibius (fl. 285–222 BC) fitted his clepsydras with a dial and pointer for indicating the time, and added elaborate "alarm systems, which could be made to drop pebbles on a gong, or blow trumpets (by forcing bell-jars down into water and taking the compressed air through a beating reed) at pre-set times" (Vitruv 11.11).	
Odometer	c. 3rd century BC	Odometer, a device used in the late Hellenistic time and by Romans for indicating the distance traveled by a vehicle. It was invented sometime in the 3rd century BC. Some historians attribute it to Archimedes, others to Heron of Alexandria. It helped revolutionize the building of roads and traveling by them by accurately measuring distance and being able to carefully illustrate this with a milestone.	
Chain drive	3rd century BC	First described by Philo of Byzantium, the device powered a repeating crossbow, the first known of its kind.	
Cannon	c. 3rd century BC	Ctesibius of Alexandria invented a primitive form of the cannon, operated by compressed air.	
Double-action principle	3rd century BC	Universal mechanical principle that was discovered and first applied by the engineer Ctesibius in his double-action piston pump, which was later developed further by Heron to a fire hose (see below).	
Levers	c. 260 BC	First described about 260 BC by the ancient Greek mathematician Archimedes. Although used in prehistoric times, they were first put to practical use for more developed technologies in Ancient Greece.	
Water mill	c. 250 BC	The use of water power was pioneered by the Greeks: The earliest mention of a water mill in history occurs in Philo's Pneumatics, previously been regarded as a later Arabic interpolation, but according to recent research to be of authentic Greek origin.	
Three-masted ship (mizzen)	c. 240 BC:	First recorded for Syracusia as well as other Syracusan (merchant) ships under Hiero II of Syracuse	
Gimbal	3rd century BC	The inventor Philo of Byzantium (280–220 BC) described an eight-sided ink pot with an opening on each side, which can be turned so that any face is on top, dip in a pen and ink it-yet the ink never runs out through the holes of the side. This was done by the suspension of the inkwell at the center, which was mounted on a series of concentric metal rings which remained stationary no matter which way the pot turns itself.	
Dry dock	c. 200 BC	Invented in Ptolemaic Egypt under Ptolemy IV Philopator (reigned 221–204 BC) as recorded by Athenaeus of Naucratis(V 204c-d).	
Fore-and-aft rig (spritsail)	2nd century BC	Spritsails, the earliest fore-and-aft rigs, appeared in the 2nd century BC in the Aegean Sea on small Greek craft.	A spritsail used on a Roman merchant ship (3rd century AD).
Air and water pumps	c. 2nd century BC	Ctesibius and various other Greeks of Alexandria of the period developed and put to practical use various air and water pumps which served a variety of purposes, such as a water organ and, by the 1st century AD, Heron's fountain.	
Sakia gear	2nd century BC	First appeared in 2nd century BC Hellenistic Egypt, where pictorial evidence already showed it fully developed	
Surveying tools	c. 2nd century BC	Various records relating to mentions of surveying tools have been discovered, mostly in Alexandrian sources, these greatly helped the development of the precision of Roman aqueducts.	
Analog computers	c. 150 BC	In 1900–1901, the Antikythera mechanism was found in the Antikythera wreck. It is thought that this device was an analog computer designed to calculate astronomical positions and was used to predict lunar and solar eclipses based on Babylonian arithmetic-progression cycles. Whereas the Antikythera mechanism is considered the proper analog computer, the astrolabe (also invented by the Greeks) may be considered as a forerunner.	
Fire hose	1st century BC	Invented by Heron based on Ctesibius' double-action piston pump. Allowed for more efficient fire fighting.	
Vending machine	1st century BC	The first vending machine was described by Heron of Alexandria. His machine accepted a coin and then dispensed a fixed amount of holy water. When the coin was deposited, it fell upon a pan attached to a lever. The lever opened up a valve, which let some water flow out. The pan continued to tilt with the weight of the coin until it fell off, at which point a counter-weight would snap the lever back up and turn off the valve.	
Wind vane	50 BC	The Tower of the Winds on the Roman agora in Athens featured atop a wind vane in the form of a bronze Triton holding a rod in his outstretched hand rotating to the wind blowing. Below, its frieze was adorned with the eight wind deities. The 8 m high structure also featured sundials and a water clock inside dates from around 50 BC.	
Clock tower	50 BC	See Clock tower.	Tower of the Winds
Automatic doors	c. 1st century AD	Heron of Alexandria, a 1st-century BC inventor from Alexandria, Egypt, created schematics for automatic doors to be used in a temple with the aid of steam power.	

== See also ==
- Museum of Ancient Greek Technology
- Roman technology
- Medieval technology
- List of Byzantine inventions
- List of Greek inventions and discoveries

== Sources ==
- Oleson, John Peter (1984), Greek and Roman Mechanical Water-Lifting Devices: The History of a Technology, University of Toronto Press, ISBN 90-277-1693-5
