= List of Byzantine inventions =

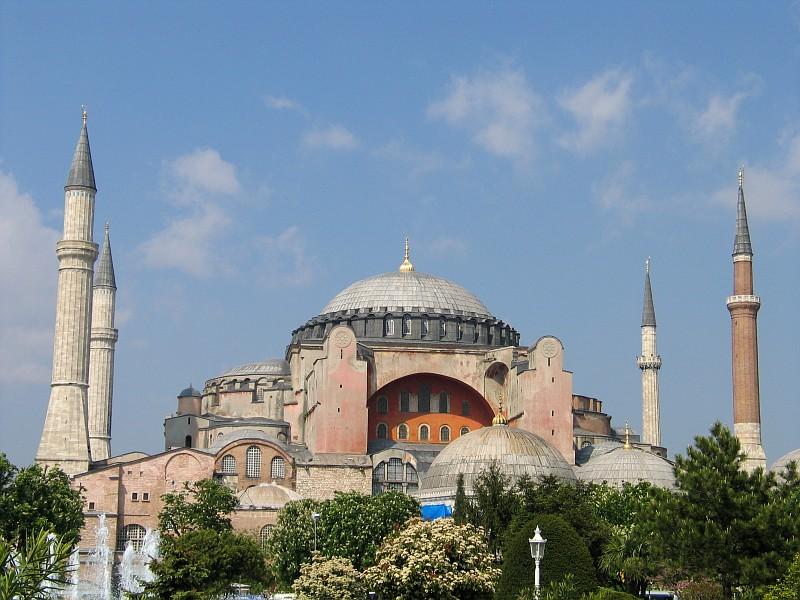
The characteristic multi-domed profile of the Byzantine Hagia Sophia, the first pendentive dome in history, has shaped Orthodox and Islamic architecture alike.

This is a list of Byzantine inventions. The Byzantine or Eastern Roman Empire represented the continuation of the Roman Empire after a part of it collapsed. Its main characteristics were Roman state traditions, Greek culture and Christian faith.

== Architecture ==
- Cross-in-square: The cross-in-square was the dominant architectural form of middle Byzantine churches. Marking a decided departure from the oblong ground plan of the basilica, it has been described as "a type of church that was, in its own way, perfect". The earliest extant example being the Theotokos church in Constantinople (907/908), its development can be traced back with a fair degree of certainty at least to the Nea Ekklesia, consecrated in 880/881.
- Pendentive dome: Generally speaking, a pendentive is a construction solution which allows a circular dome to be built atop a rectangular floor plan. While preliminary forms already evolved in Roman dome construction, the first fully developed pendentive dome dates to the reconstruction of the Hagia Sophia in 564. Devised by Isodorus the Younger, the nephew of the first architect Isidore of Miletus, the in-circle design, with a maximum diameter of 31.24 m, remained unsurpassed until the Renaissance (see Florence Cathedral). The Hagia Sophia became the paradigmatic Orthodox church form and its architectural style was emulated by Turkish mosques a thousand years later.
- Pointed arch bridge: The earliest known bridge resting on a pointed arch is the 5th or 6th century AD Karamagara Bridge in Cappadocia. Its single arch of 17 m spanned an affluent of the Euphrates. A Greek inscription, citing from the Bible, runs along one side of its arch rib. The structure is today submerged by the Keban Reservoir.
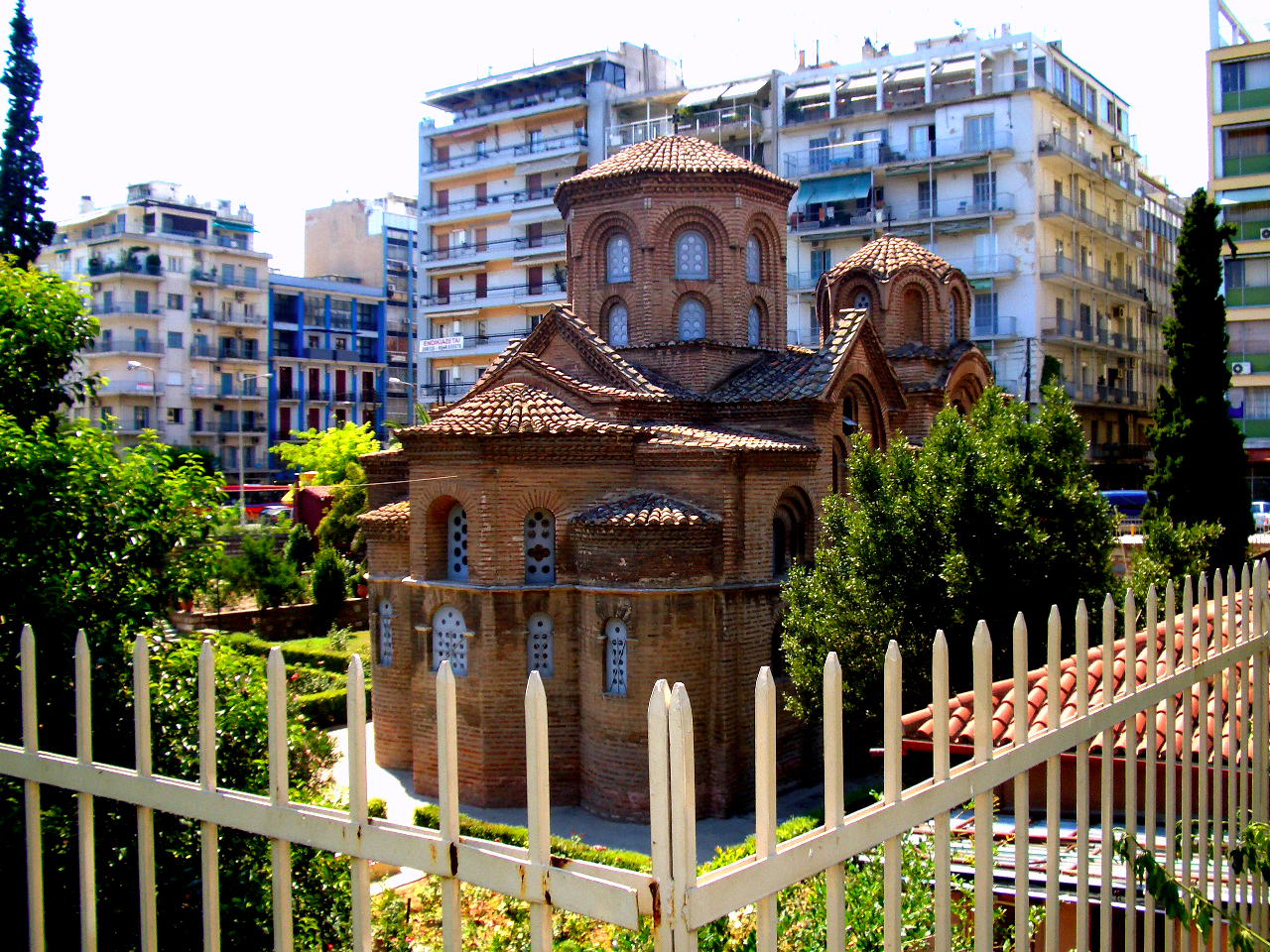
Panagia Chalkeion, an 11th-century cross-in-square church

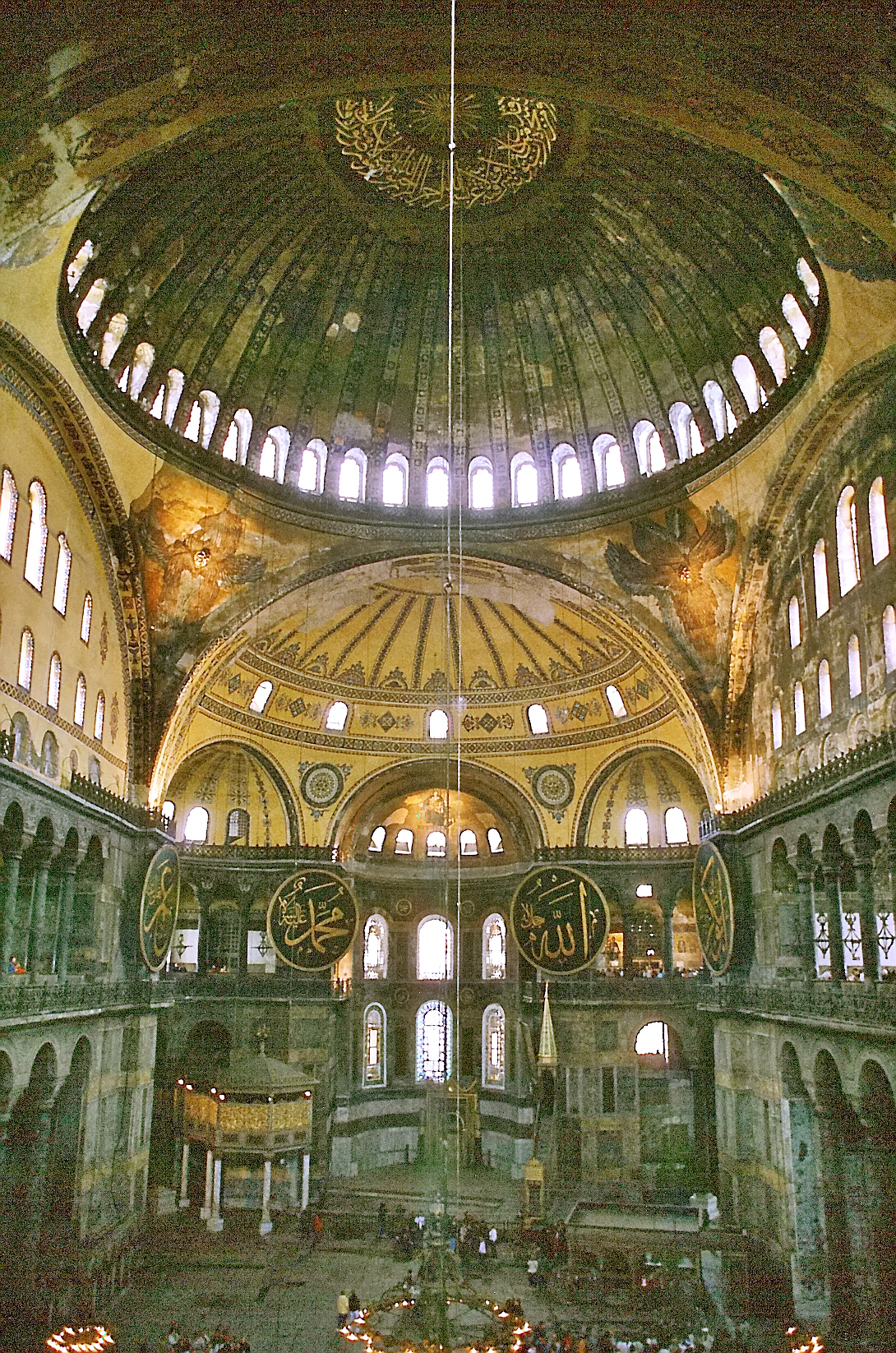
Pendentive dome of Hagia Sophia (563), interior view

== Warfare ==
Course of the main Byzantine beacon line between Constantinople and Loulon on the Cilician Gates

- Counterweight trebuchet: The earliest written record of the counterweight trebuchet, a vastly more powerful design than the simple traction trebuchet, appears in the work of the 12th-century historian Niketas Choniates. Niketas describes a stone projector used by future emperor Andronikos I Komnenos at the siege of Zevgminon I 1165. This was equipped with a windlass, an apparatus required neither for the traction nor hybrid trebuchet to launch missiles. Chevedden hypothesizes that the new artillery type was introduced at the 1097 Siege of Nicaea when emperor Alexios I Komnenos, an ally of the besieging crusaders, was reported to have invented new pieces of heavy artillery which deviated from the conventional design and made a deep impression on everyone.
- Beacon system: In the 10th century, during the Arab–Byzantine wars, the Byzantine Empire used a beacon system to transmit messages from the border with the Abbasid Caliphate, across Anatolia to the imperial palace in the Byzantine capital, Constantinople. It was devised by Leo the Mathematician for Emperor Theophilos, but either abolished or radically curtailed by Theophilos' son and successor, Michael III. Beacons were later used in Greece as well, while the surviving parts of the beacon system in Anatolia seem to have been reactivated in the 12th century by Emperor Manuel I Komnenos.
- Hand-trebuchet: The hand-trebuchet (cheiromangana) was a staff sling mounted on a pole using a lever mechanism to propel projectiles. Basically a portable trebuchet which could be operated by a single man, it was advocated by emperor Nikephoros II Phokas around 965 to disrupt enemy formations in the open field. It was also mentioned in the Taktika of general Nikephoros Ouranos (c. 1000), and listed in the Anonymus De obsidione toleranda as a form of artillery.
- Greek fire: The invention and military employment of Greek fire played a crucial role in the defense of the empire against the early onslaught of the Muslim Arabs. Brought to Constantinople by a refugee from Syria by the name of Kallinikos, the incendiary weapon came just in time to save the capital from the Muslim sieges of 674–678 and 717–718, which might have otherwise proven fatal to the Byzantine state.
  Greek fire, referred to by Byzantine chroniclers as "sea fire" or "liquid fire", was primarily a naval weapon, used in ship-to-ship battle against enemy galleys. The exact composition was a well-guarded state secret, to the point that modern scholars continue to debate its ingredients, but the main method of projection is fairly clear, indicating effectively a flame-thrower: The liquid mixture, heated in a brazier and pressurized by means of a pump, was ejected by an operator through a siphon in any direction against the enemy Alternatively, it could be poured down from swivel cranes or hurled in pottery grenades.
  Greek fire held a fearsome reputation among Byzantium's numerous enemies who began to field – probably differently composed – combustibles of their own. It was, however, no wonder weapon, but dependent on favourable conditions such as a calm sea and wind coming from behind. When and how the use of Greek fire was discontinued is not exactly known. According to one theory, the Byzantines lost the secret due to over-compartmentalization long before the 1204 sack of Constantinople.
- Incendiary grenade: Grenades appeared not long after the reign of Leo III (717–741), when Byzantine soldiers learned that Greek fire could not only be projected by flamethrowers, but also be thrown in stone and ceramic jars. Larger containers were hurled by catapults or trebuchets at the enemy, either ignited before release or set alight by fire arrows after impact. Grenades were later adopted for use by Muslim armies: Vessels of the characteristic spheroconical shape which many authors identify as grenade shells were found over much of the Islamic world, and a possible workshop for grenade production from the 13th century was excavated at the Syrian city of Hama.
- Flamethrower: for ship-borne flamethrowers, see Greek fire above. Portable hand-siphons were used in land warfare.
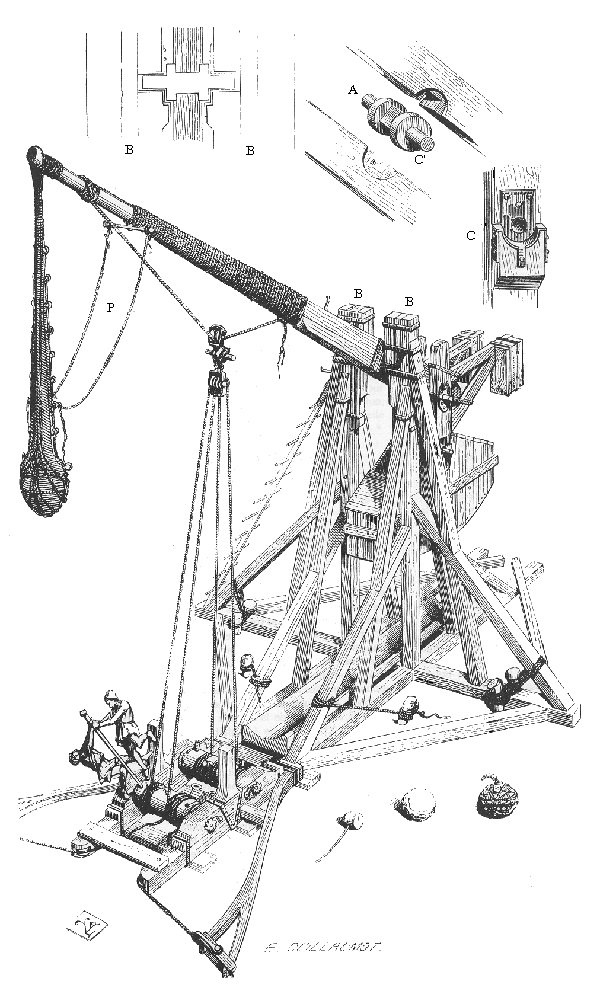
Modern drawing of a counterweight trebuchet being prepared for shooting

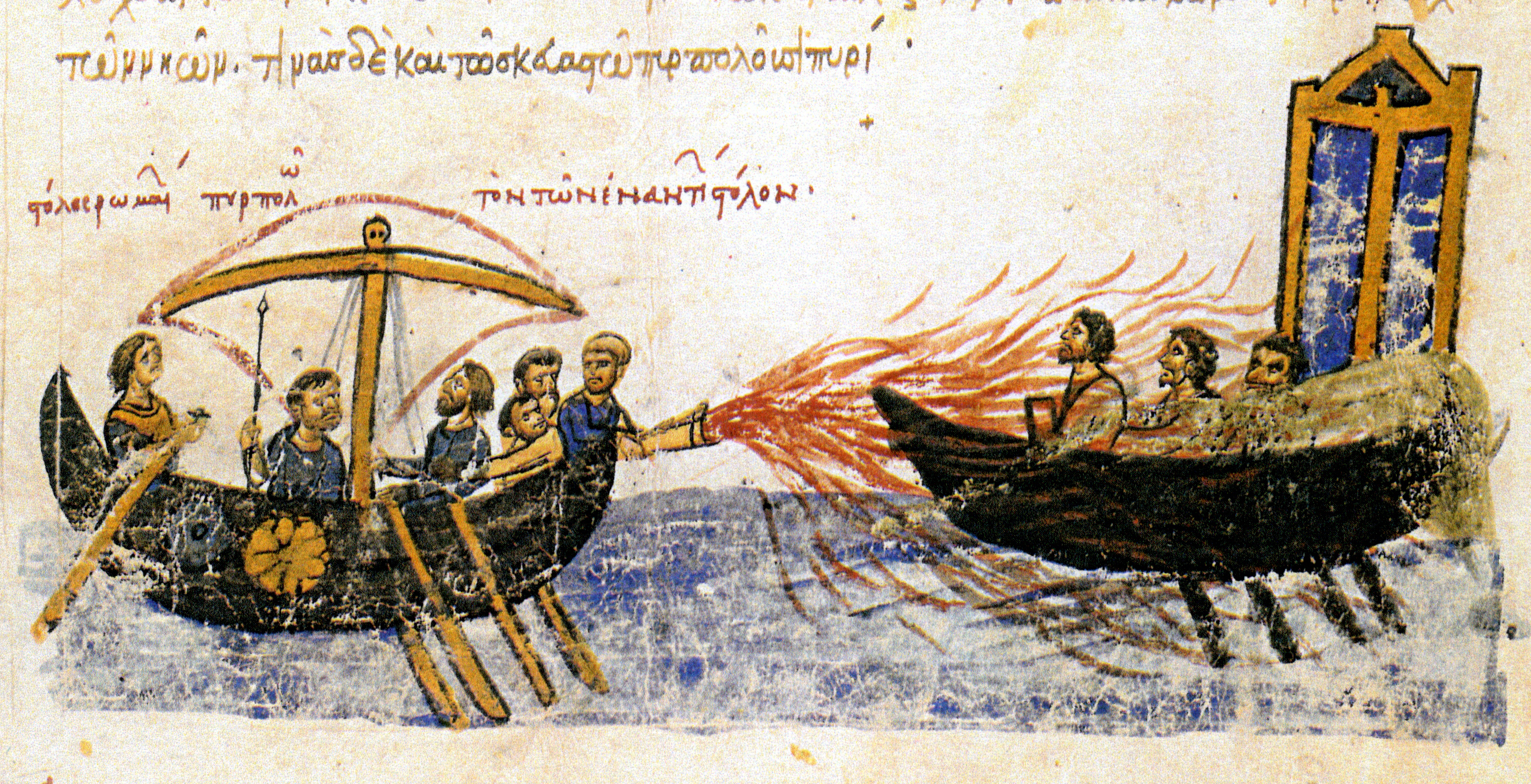
Byzantine ship employing Greek fire in the late 11th century

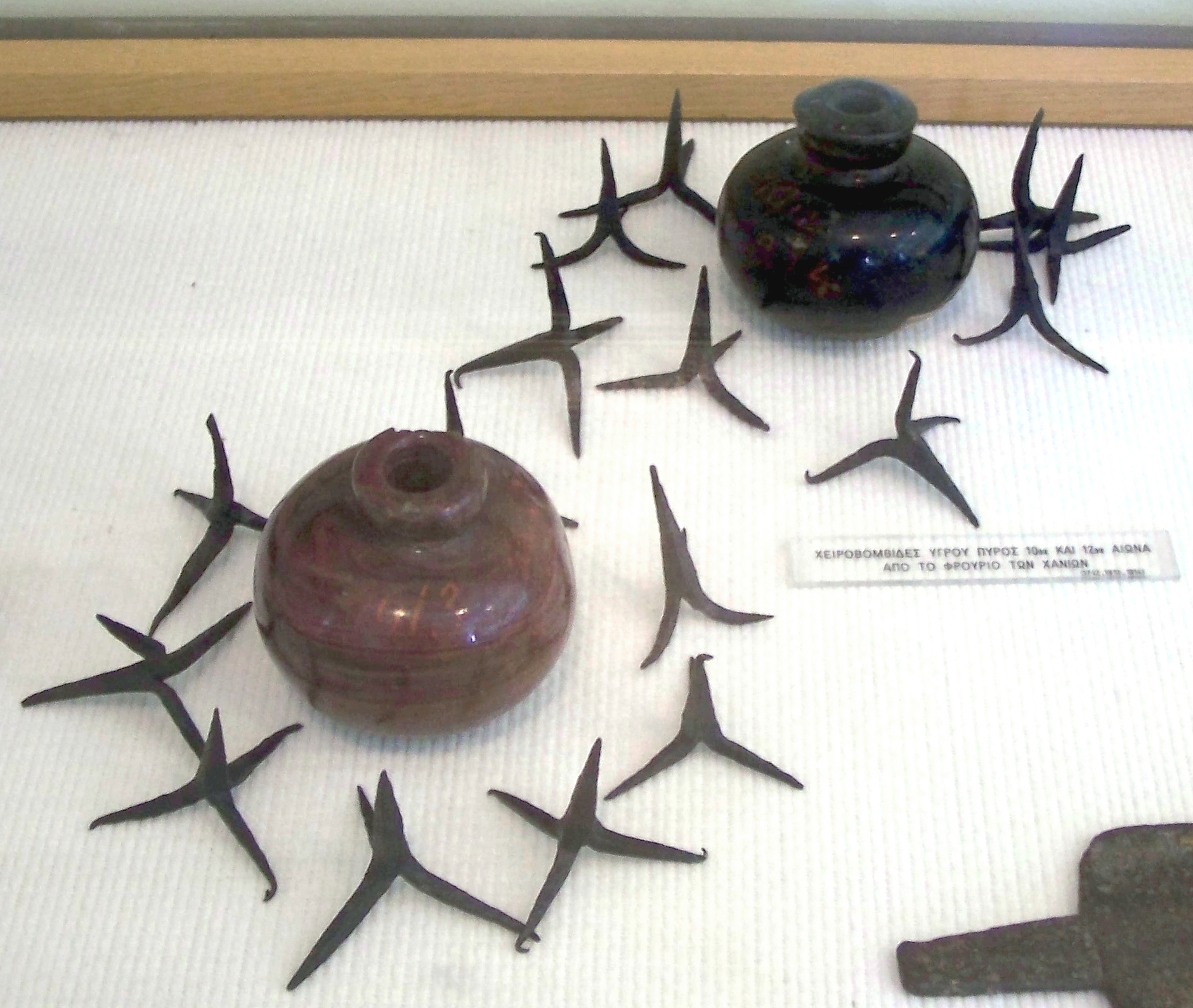
Clay grenades that were filled with Greek fire (10th–12th centuries)

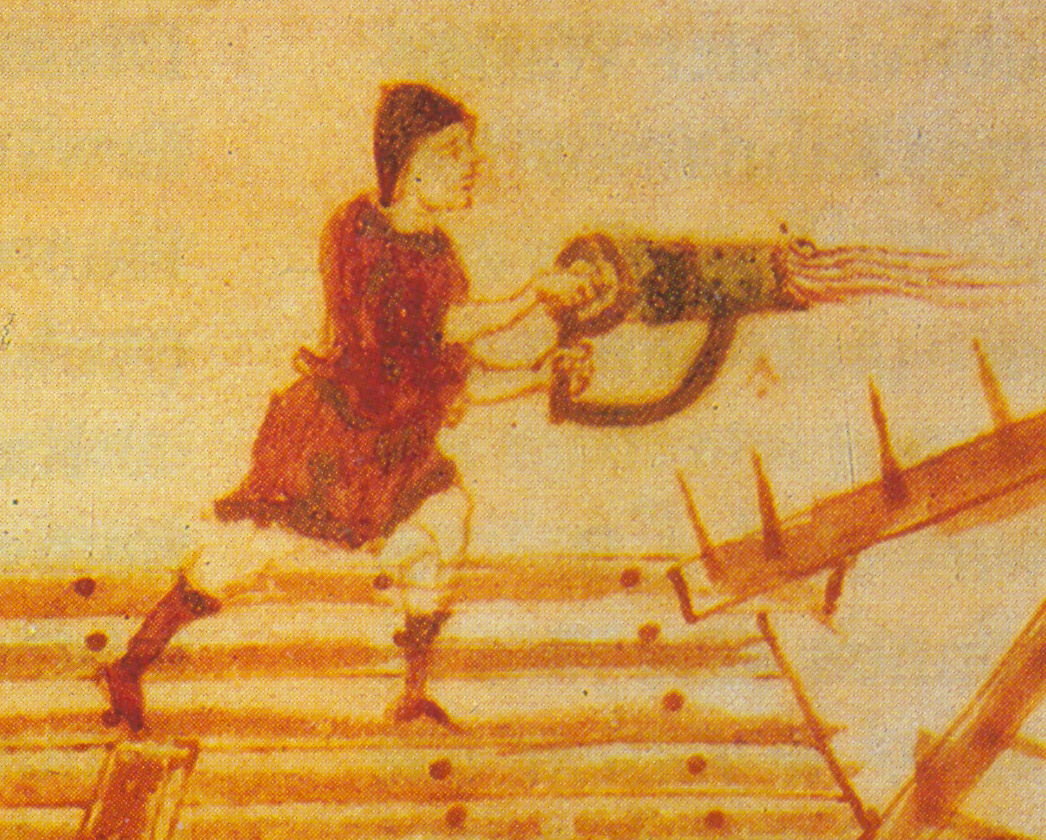
Hand-siphon, a portable flamethrower

== Culture and religion ==
- Fork: The fork was originally used as a utensil for picking up and eating food in the 7th century by the nobles of the Byzantine empire. It was later introduced to western Europe through the marriage of Maria Argyropoulina to Giovanni Orseolo. The story goes that during her wedding feast she used her personal two pronged golden fork to eat. The Venetians, eating with their hands, considered using the fork blasphemous; one member of the clergy claimed, "God in his wisdom has provided man with natural forks—his fingers. Therefore it is an insult to him to substitute artificial metal forks for them when eating". She died of a disease several years later. Venetians claimed this was the result of her disrespecting God with her fork.
- Byzantine lyra: Medieval bowed string musical instrument in the Byzantine (Eastern Roman) Empire.
- Icon: Icons are images of holy beings such as Jesus, Mary and the saints which, painted according to certain traditional rules, have been playing a pivotal role in Eastern Orthodox Church veneration since its early days. The most distinctive Byzantine form are representations on portable wooden panels painted in the Hellenistic techniques of tempera or encaustic. Other varieties include (precious) metal reliefs or mosaic-style panels set with tesserae of precious stones, gold, silver and ivory. The use of icons was violently opposed during the iconoclastic controversy which dominated much of Byzantium's internal politics in the 8th and 9th centuries, but was finally resumed by the victorious iconodules. Only few early icons have survived the iconoclasm, the most prominent examples being the 6th–7th century collection from Saint Catherine's Monastery.
- Feta: Feta cheese, specifically, is first recorded in the Byzantine Empire in Avicenna's Poem on Medicine under the name prósphatos (πρόσφατος, "recent" or "fresh"), and was produced by the Cretans and the Aromanians of Thessaly.

== Law ==
- Corpus Juris Civilis: Emperor Justinian the Great initiated reforms that had a clear effect on the evolution of jurisprudence. His Corpus Juris Civilis became the foundation of jurisprudence in western and southern Europe.
- Ekloge ton nomon: An 8th century legal code compiled under the reign of either Leo III or Constantine V. It inspired Slavic, Moravian, Bulgarian, Norman, Arab, Armenian and Serbian legal codes for centuries.

== Science, industry and medicine ==
- Ship mill: The historian Procopius records that ship mills were introduced by Belisarius during the siege of Rome (537/538), initially as a makeshift solution. After the Ostrogoths had interrupted the water supply of the aqueducts on which the city depended to run its gristmills, Belisarius ordered riverboats to be fitted with mill gearing; these were moored between bridge piers where the strong current powered the water wheels mounted on the vessel. The innovative use quickly found acceptance among medieval watermillers, reaching Paris and the Frankish Realm only two decades later.
- The theory of impetus: The theory was introduced by John Philoponus, and it is the precursor to the concepts of inertia, momentum and acceleration.
- Hospital: The concept of hospital as institution to offer medical care and possibility of a cure for the patients due to the ideals of Christian charity, rather than just merely a place to die, appeared in Byzantine Empire.
- Separation of conjoined twins: The first known example of separating conjoined twins happened in the Byzantine Empire in the 10th century. A pair of conjoined twins lived in Constantinople for many years when one of them died, so the surgeons in Constantinople decided to remove the body of the dead one. The result was partly successful as the surviving twin lived three days before dying. The fact that the second person survived for few days after separating him was still being mentioned a century and a half later by historians. The next recorded case of separating conjoined twins was 1689 in Germany.
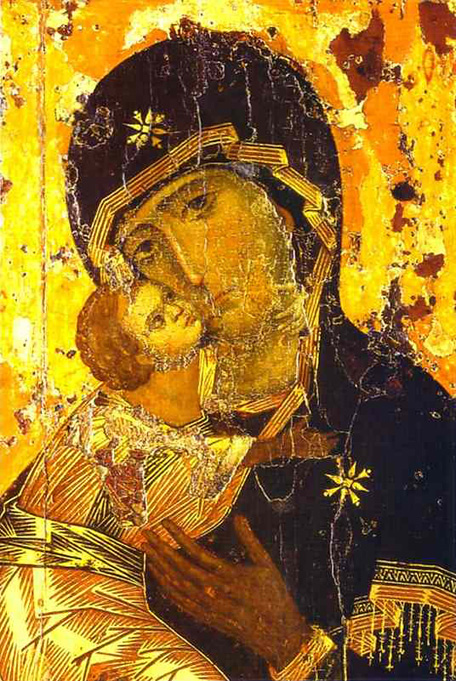
Virgin of Vladimir, a 12th-century icon

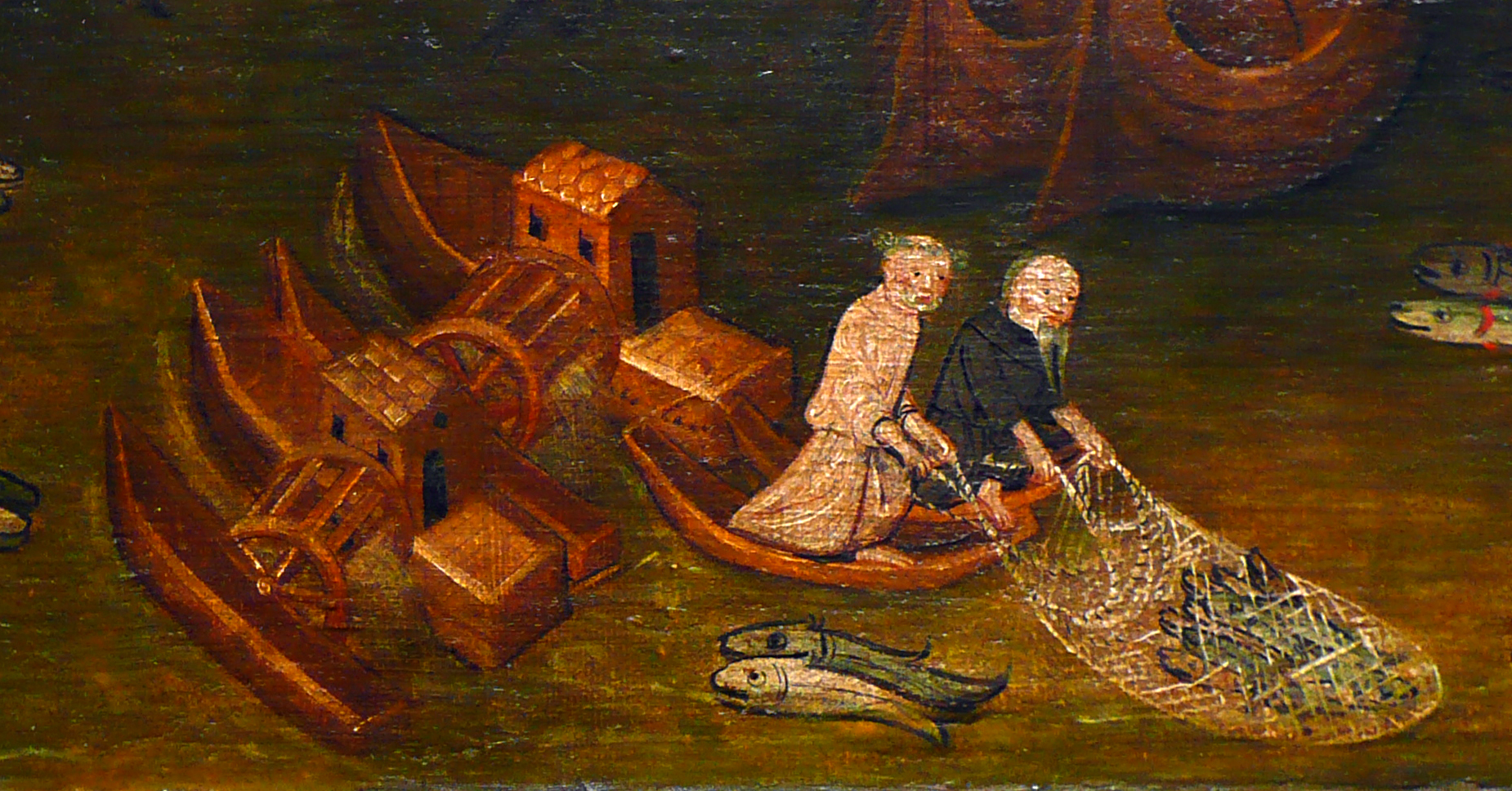
Medieval ship mills on the Rhine

== See also ==
- List of Greek inventions and discoveries
- Ancient Greek technology

== Sources ==
- Chevedden, Paul E. (2000), "The Invention of the Counterweight Trebuchet: A Study in Cultural Diffusion", Dumbarton Oaks Papers, 54: 71–116, doi:10.2307/1291833, JSTOR 1291833
- Ellis Davidson, H. R. (1973), "The Secret Weapon of Byzantium", Byzantinische Zeitschrift, 66 (1): 61–74
- Forbes, R. J. (1964), Studies in Ancient Technology, vol. 1 (2nd ed.), Leiden: E. J. Brill, p. 107
- Galliazzo, Vittorio (1995), I ponti romani, vol. 1, Treviso: Edizioni Canova, pp. 92, 93 (fig. 39), ISBN 88-85066-66-6
- Guillou, André (1993), La Civiltà bizantina, oggetti e messagio, Rome: L'Erma di Bretschneider, pp. 36, 62 (fig. 24), ISBN 978-88-7062-801-2
- Haldon, J.; Byrne, M. (1977), "A Possible Solution to the Problem of Greek Fire", Byzantinische Zeitschrift, 70 (1): 91–99, doi:10.1515/byzs.1977.70.1.91, S2CID 191489863
- Heinle, Erwin; Schlaich, Jörg (1996), Kuppeln aller Zeiten, aller Kulturen, Stuttgart, ISBN 3-421-03062-6
- Hellenkemper, H. (1977–1999), "Brücke: Byzantinischer Brückenbau", Lexikon des Mittelalters, vol. 2, Stuttgart: Metzler, pp. 730–731
- Hild, Friedrich (1977), "Das byzantinische Strassensystem in Kappadokien", in Hunger, Herbert (ed.), Veröffentlichungen der Kommission für die Tabula Imperii Byzantini, vol. 2, Wien: Verlag der Österreichischen Akademie der Wissenschaften, p. 145, ISBN 3-7001-0168-6
- Kazhdan, Alexander P., ed. (1991), The Oxford Dictionary of Byzantium, vol. 2, New York: Oxford University Press, pp. 977–981, ISBN 0-19-504652-8
- Kinder, Hermann; Hilgemann, Werner, eds. (1989), dtv-Atlas zur Weltgeschichte, Von den Anfängen bis zur Französischen Revolution, vol. 1 (23rd ed.), München: Deutscher Taschenbuch Verlag, ISBN 3-423-03001-1
- Lange, Dorothea (1986), "Theorien zur Entstehung der byzantinischen Kreuzkuppelkirche", Architectura, 16: 93–113
- Mango, Cyril (1976), Byzantine Architecture, New York: H. N. Abrams, p. 129 (plate 138), ISBN 0-8109-1004-7
- O’Connor, Colin (1993), Roman Bridges, Cambridge University Press, p. 129 (E38), ISBN 0-521-39326-4
- Ousterhout, Robert (1996), "An Apologia for Byzantine Architecture", Gesta, 35 (1): 21–33, doi:10.2307/767224, JSTOR 767224, S2CID 193354724
- Pászthory, Emmerich (1986), "Über das "Griechische Feuer". Die Analyse eines spätantiken Waffensystems", Antike Welt, 17 (2): 27–37
- Pentcheva, Bissera V. (2010), "What is a Byzantine Icon? Constantinople versus Sinai", in Stephenson, Paul (ed.), The Byzantine World, Taylor & Francis, pp. 265–283, ISBN 978-0-415-44010-3
- Pentz, Peter (1988), "A Medieval Workshop for Producing 'Greek fire' Grenades", Antiquity, 62 (234): 89–93, doi:10.1017/S0003598X00073531, S2CID 163672516
- Pryor, John H.; Jeffreys, Elizabeth M. (2006), The Age of the ΔΡΟΜΩΝ. The Byzantine Navy ca. 500–1204, The Medieval Mediterranean. Peoples, Economies and Cultures, 400–1500, vol. 62, Brill Academic Publishers, ISBN 978-90-04-15197-0
- Rasch, Jürgen (1985), "Die Kuppel in der römischen Architektur. Entwicklung, Formgebung, Konstruktion", Architectura, vol. 15, pp. 117–139
- Roland, Alex (1992), "Secrecy, Technology, and War: Greek Fire and the Defense of Byzantium, 678-1204", Technology and Culture, 33 (4): 655–679, doi:10.2307/3106585, JSTOR 3106585, S2CID 113017993
- Tunç, Gülgün (1978), Tas Köprülerimiz, Ankara, p. 108
- Wikander, Örjan (2000), "The Water-Mill", in Wikander, Örjan (ed.), Handbook of Ancient Water Technology, Technology and Change in History, vol. 2, Leiden: Brill, pp. 371–400, ISBN 90-04-11123-9
