= Aegimus =

5th-century BC Greek physician

Aegimus or Aegimius (Αἴγιμος or Αἰγίμιος) was one of the most ancient of the Greek physicians, who is said by Galen to have been the first person who wrote a treatise on the pulse. He was a native of Velia in Lucania, and is supposed to have lived before the time of Hippocrates, that is, in the 5th century BC. His work was entitled Περί Παλμων (Lat. De Palpitationibus, a name which alone sufficiently indicates its antiquity), which is no longer extant.

Athenaeus (2nd century AD) mentions that Callimachus (3rd century BC) used to have a work by "Aegimius" that described the art of making cheesecakes (πλακουντοπουκόν σύγγραμμα), and Pliny the Elder mentions a person of the same name who was said to have lived two hundred years; but whether these are the same or different individuals is quite uncertain.
