= Philo of Byzantium =

3rd-century BCE Greek engineer, physicist and writer

Philo of Byzantium Φίλων ὁ Βυζάντιος
- Born: c. 280 BC; Byzantium
- Died: c. 220 BCE
- Occupations: Engineer; Physician; Writer

Philo of Byzantium (Note: The name also appears, less often, as Philon, Philon of Byzantium, Philo Byzantium, and Philo Byzanticus.) (Ancient Greek: Φίλων ὁ Βυζάντιος, romanized: Phílōn ho Byzántios, c. 280 BC – c. 220 BC), also known as Philo Mechanicus, 'Philo the Engineer' in Latin, was a Greek engineer, physicist and writer on mechanics, who lived during the latter half of the 3rd century BC. Although he was from Byzantium he lived most of his life in Alexandria, Egypt. He was probably younger than Ctesibius, though some place him a century earlier.

== Works ==
Philo was the author of a large work, the Syntaxis (Ancient Greek: Μηχανική Σύνταξη, romanized: Mēkhanikḗ Sýntaxē, lit. 'System of mechanics'), (Note: Also various translated as the Compendium of Mechanics, the Engineering Compendium, the Compendium, and Mechanical Collections.) which contained the following sections:

- Isagoge (Εἰσαγωγή, Eisagōgḗ, 'Introduction'; general mathematics)
- Mochlica (Μοχλικά, Mokhliká, 'Concerning Leverage'; mechanics)
- Limenopoeica (Λιμενοποιικά, Limenopoiiká, 'Harbour Construction')
- Belopoeica Βελοποιικά, Belopoiiká, 'Siege Engine Construction')
- Pneumatica (Πνευματικά, Pneumatiká, 'Pneumatics')
- Automatopoeica (Αὐτοματοποιητικά, Automatopoiētiká, 'Construction of Automatons'; mechanical toys and diversions)
- Parasceuastica (Παρασκευαστικά, Paraskeuastiká, 'Preparations'; for sieges) (Note: The Parasceuastica and Poliorcetica are typically translated together as "On Sieges")
- Poliorcetica (Πολιορκητικά, Poliorkētiká, 'Siegecraft')
- Peri Epistolon (Περὶ Ἐπιστολῶν, Perì Epistolō̂n, 'On Correspondence'; on coding and hidden letters for military use)

The military sections Belopoeica and Poliorcetica are extant in Greek, detailing missiles, the construction of fortresses, provisioning, attack and defence, as are fragments of Isagoge and Automatopoeica (ed. R. Schone, 1893, with German translation in Hermann August Theodor Köchly's Griechische Kriegsschriftsteller, vol. i. 1853; E. A. Rochas d'Aiglun, Poliorcetique des Grecs, 1872).

Another portion of the work, on pneumatic engines, has been preserved in the form of a Latin translation (De Ingeniis Spiritualibus) of an Arabic translation (ed. W. Schmidt, with German translation, in the works of Heron of Alexandria, vol. i., in the Teubner series, 1899; with French translation by Rochas, La Science des philosophes... dans l'antiquité, 1882). Further portions probably survive in a derivative form, incorporated into the works of Vitruvius and of Arabic authors.

The Philo line, a geometric construction that can be used to double the cube, is attributed to Philo.

=== Devices ===
According to recent research, a section of Philo's Pneumatics which so far has been regarded as a later Arabic interpolation, includes the first description of a water mill in history, placing the invention of the water mill in the mid-third century BC by the Greeks.

Philo's works also contain the oldest known application of a chain drive in a repeating crossbow. Two flat-linked chains were connected to a windlass, which by winding back and forth would automatically fire the machine's arrows until its magazine was empty.

Philo also was the first to describe a gimbal: an eight-sided ink pot that could be turned any way without spilling and expose the ink on top. This was done by the suspension of the inkwell at the centre, which was mounted on a series of concentric metal rings which remained stationary no matter which way the pot turns.

In his Pneumatics (chapter 31) Philo describes an escapement mechanism, the earliest known, as part of a washstand. A counterweighted spoon, supplied by a water tank, tips over in a basin when full releasing a pumice in the process. Once the spoon has emptied, it is pulled up again by the counterweight, closing the door on the pumice by the tightening string. Remarkably, Philo's comment that "its construction is similar to that of clocks" indicates that such escapements mechanism were already integrated in ancient water clocks.

He is also credited with the construction of the first thermoscope (or Philo thermometer), an early version of the thermometer.

=== Mathematics ===
In mathematics, Philo tackled the problem of doubling the cube. The doubling of the cube was necessitated by the following problem: given a catapult, construct a second catapult that is capable of firing a projectile twice as heavy as the projectile of the first catapult. His solution was to find the point of intersection of a rectangular hyperbola and a circle, a solution that is similar to the solution given by Hero of Alexandria several centuries later.

=== Apocrypha ===
A treatise titled "Seven Wonders of the World" (Περὶ τῶν Ἑπτὰ Θεαμάτων, Perì tō̂n Heptà Theamátōn) (Note: The title is also frequently given in Latin as De Septem Mundi Miraculis, De VII Mundi Miraculis, or De 7 Mundi Miraculis.) is sometimes attributed to this Philo but more probably belongs to a different Philo of Byzantium, distinguished as Philo the Paradoxographer, who lived in a much later date, probably the 4th–5th century AD. It is printed in R. Hercher's edition of Aelian (Paris: Firmin Didot, 1858); an English translation by Jean Blackwood is included as an appendix in The Seven Wonders of the World by Michael Ashley (Glasgow: Fontana Paperbacks, 1980).

== See also ==
- Chain pump
- William M. Murray, The Age of Titans – the rise and fall of the great Hellenistic navies. New York, Oxford University Press, 2012. Appenedix E: Book V of Philo's Compendium of Mechanics – The Naval Sections (translated to English), pp. 282–301 .
