= Heron's fountain =

Hydraulic machine

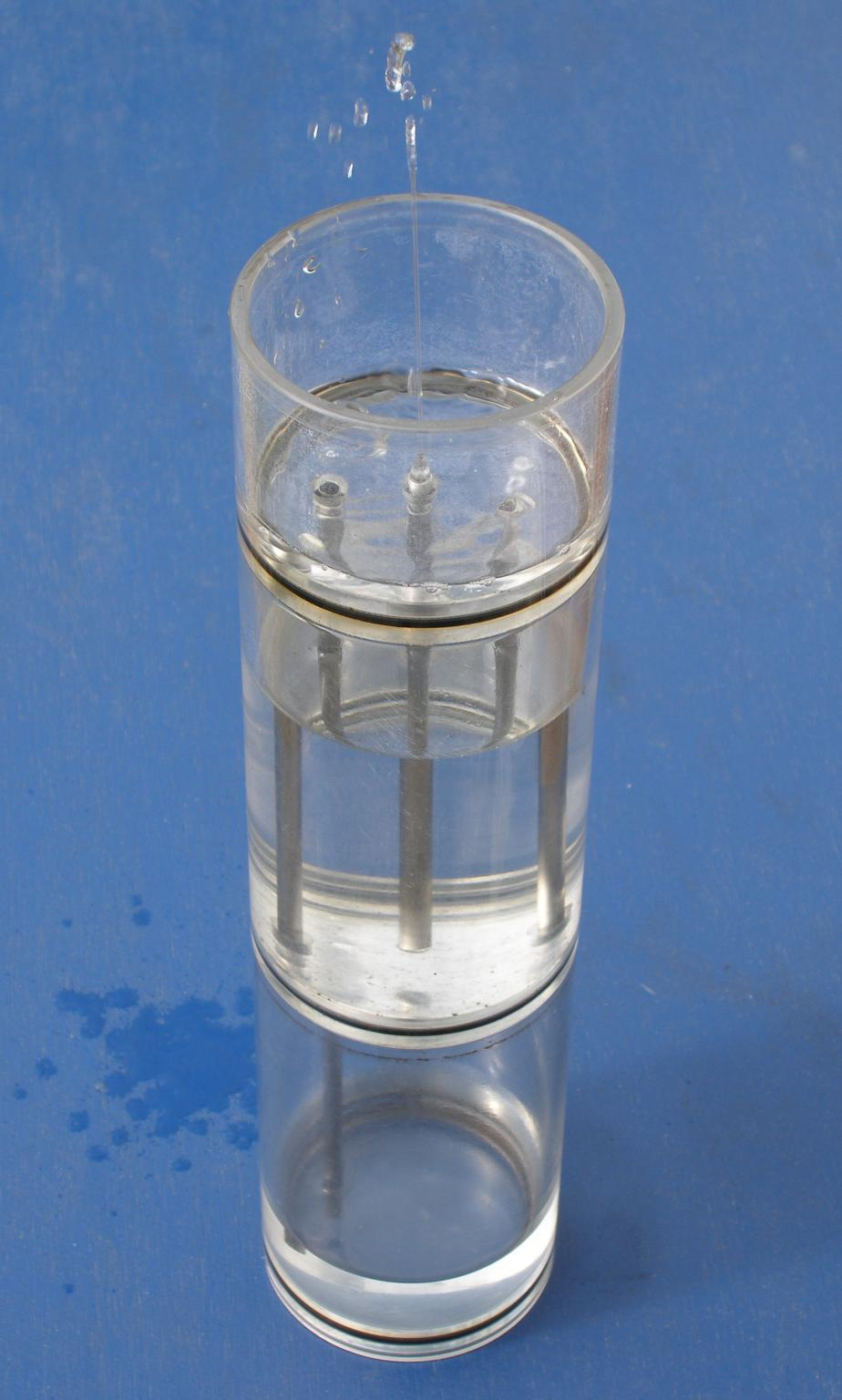
Executed example of a Heron's fountain in operation

Heron's fountain is a hydraulic machine invented by the 1st century AD inventor, mathematician, and physicist Heron (or Hero) of Alexandria.

Heron studied the pressure of air and steam, described the first steam engine, and built toys that would spurt water, one of them known as Heron's fountain. Various versions of Heron's fountain are used today in physics classes as a demonstration of principles of hydraulics and pneumatics.

== Construction ==
Diagram of a functioning Heron's fountain

Simplified Heron's fountain principle

In the following description, call the 3 containers:

- (A) Top: basin
- (B) Middle: water supply
- (C) Bottom: air supply

and three pipes:

- P1 (on the left in the picture) from a hole in the bottom of basin (A) to the bottom of air supply container (C)
- P2 (on the right in the picture) from the top of the air supply container (C) to the top of the water supply container (B)
- P3 (in the middle of the picture) from the bottom of the water supply container (B), up through the bottom of the basin (A) to a height above the basin's rim. The fountain issues upwards through this pipe. The maximum height of P3 pipe depends on the height between B and C (see below).

Container A can be closed and airtight, but it is not necessary. B and C, however, must be airtight and resistant to atmospheric pressure. Plastic bottles suffice, but glass containers work better. Balloons do not work because they cannot hold pressure without deforming. The fountain works in the following way:

- The energy for moving the water ultimately comes from the water in A descending into C.
- This means the water in B can rise into A only as much as it falls from A to C.
- Water falling from A down to C through pipe P1 builds up pressure in the bottom container; this pressure is proportional to the height difference between A and C.
- Pressure is transmitted by the air through pipe P2 into the water supply B, and pushes the water up into pipe P3.
- Water moving up pipe P3 replaces water falling from A into C, closing the loop.

These principles explain the construction:

- The air in C must not escape through pipe P1, which is why P1 must go to the bottom, so that the water seals it.
- The air in B must not escape through pipe P3 either, which is why P3 must go to the bottom so that the water seals it.
- Water must be prevented from going directly through pipe P2 from B to C, so P2 must connect the top of B with C.
- If P2 were connected to C at the bottom, water would seal it and air pressure would not build up in B. So P2 must be connected at the top of C.

== Motion ==
Heron's fountain is not a perpetual motion machine. If the nozzle of the spout is narrow, it may play for several minutes, but it eventually comes to a stop. The water coming out of the tube may go higher than the level in any container, but the net flow of water is downward. If, however, the volumes of the air supply and fountain supply containers are designed to be much larger than the volume of the basin, with the flow rate of water from the nozzle of the spout being held constant, the fountain could operate for a far greater time interval.

Its action may seem less paradoxical if considered as a siphon, but with the upper arch of the tube removed, and the air pressure between the two lower containers providing the positive pressure to lift the water over the arch. The device is also known as Heron's siphon.

The gravitational potential energy of the water which falls a long way from the basin into the lower container is transferred by pneumatic pressure tube (only air is moved upwards at this stage) to push the water from the upper container a short way above the basin.

The fountain can spout (almost) as high above the upper container as the water falls from the basin into the lower container. For maximum effect, place the upper container as closely beneath the basin as possible and place the lower container a long way beneath both.

As soon as the water level in the upper container has dropped so low that the water bearing tube no longer touches the water surface, the fountain stops. In order to make the fountain play again, the air supply container is emptied of water, and the fountain supply container and the basin are refilled. Lifting the water provides the energy required.

== Reiterative motion and variants ==
Halite fountain made by joining a half-bottle of dense liquid (dark blue) to a bottle of less dense liquid (light blue) with a spout.

As previously mentioned, the fountain stops working when water from B has dropped to C. There are ways, however, to make it work again, such as:

- design piping so that once C is full and B is empty, their position can be switched.
- add valves to empty C and replenish B (in effect transferring water from C to B).
- instead of using valves, transfer water up from C to B through boiling and condensing.
- make a 4 container A-B-C-D fountain, which can be turned upside down so that the full and empty container switch places.

There also exist fountains with two liquids of different colors and density, such as the Halite fountain.

== In popular culture ==
An example of Heron's fountain, built by Larry Fleinhardt, was featured in the 8th episode (titled "Tabu") of the 4th season of the television show Numb3rs.

A reconstruction of Heron's fountain, at the Kotsanas Museum of Ancient Greek Technology, in Athens.

Heron's fountain was featured in the first episode of How Britain Worked hosted by Guy Martin.

== See also ==
- Hydraulic ram
- Pulser pump
- Vacuum ejector
- Venturi effect
- Water hammer
