= Ctesibius =

3rd-century BC Greek inventor and mathematician

- Born: c. 300 BCE; Alexandria, Egypt
- Died: c. 222 BCE; Alexandria, Egypt
- Scientific career
- Fields: Mathematics

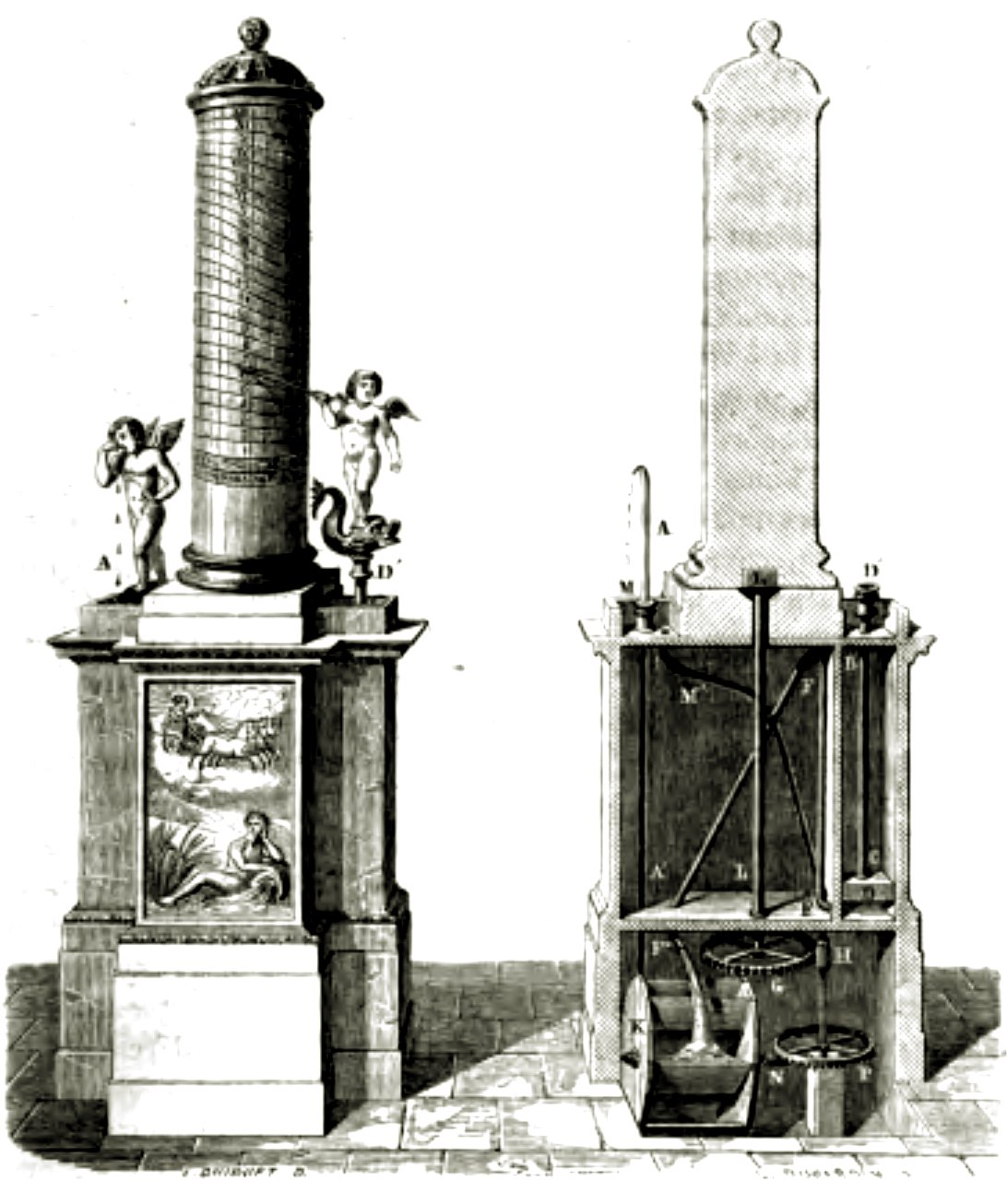
Ctesibius' water clock, as visualized by the 17th-century French architect Claude Perrault

Ctesibius or Ktesibios or Tesibius (Ancient Greek: Κτησίβιος; fl. 285–222 BCE) was a Greek inventor and mathematician in Alexandria, Ptolemaic Egypt. Very little is known of Ctesibius' life, but his inventions were well known in his lifetime. He was likely the first head of the Museum of Alexandria. He wrote the first treatises on the science of compressed air and its uses in pumps (and even in a kind of cannon). This, in combination with his work On pneumatics on the elasticity of air, earned him the title of "father of pneumatics". None of his written work has survived, including his Memorabilia, a compilation of his research that was cited by Athenaeus. Ctesibius' most commonly known invention today is a pipe organ (hydraulis), a predecessor of the modern church organ. He was married to a woman named Thais, who is not to be confused with Thaïs, the Greek hetaira who travelled with Alexander the Great on his military campaigns.

== Inventions ==
Ctesibius was the son of a barber, born c. 300 BCE, probably – but not certainly – in Alexandria. (Note: There is no direct evidence for the place of birth of Ctesibius. He is given Alexandrinus, lit. 'the Alexandrian', as "an ethnic" or "a deme" (the element in traditional Greek onomastic formulae ascribing geographic or ethnic origin), in early mentions and reference to his work, including by Vitruvius (1st century BCE) in De Architectura.) He began his career as a barber, following his father.

Reconstruction of Ctesibius' hydraulis at the Kotsanas Museum of Ancient Greek Technology, in Athens, Greece.

During this first career, he invented a counterweight-adjustable mirror. Another of his inventions was the hydraulis, a water organ that is considered the precursor of the modern pipe organ and the first keyboard instrument. He and his wife Thais were reputed to be highly-skilled players of the instrument. It is believed that he improved the hydraulics by forcing air though the pipes using the weight of water, instead of using falling lead weights. He improved the water clock or clepsydra ('water thief'), which before the improvement was inaccurate because the flow of water could not be correctly regulated and made for an inaccurate time. For more than 1,800 years, the water clock was the most accurate clock ever constructed, until the Dutch physicist Christiaan Huygens' invention of the pendulum clock in 1656. Ctesibius described one of the first force pumps for producing a jet of water, or for lifting water from wells. Examples have been found at various Roman sites, such as at Silchester in Britain. The principle of the siphon has also been attributed to him. He is also believed to have invented an air-powered catapult with his knowledge of compressed air. His inventions are only known from references by Vitruvius and Hero of Alexandria, but they acted as base for engineering works from Hero of Alexandria and Philo of Byzantium.

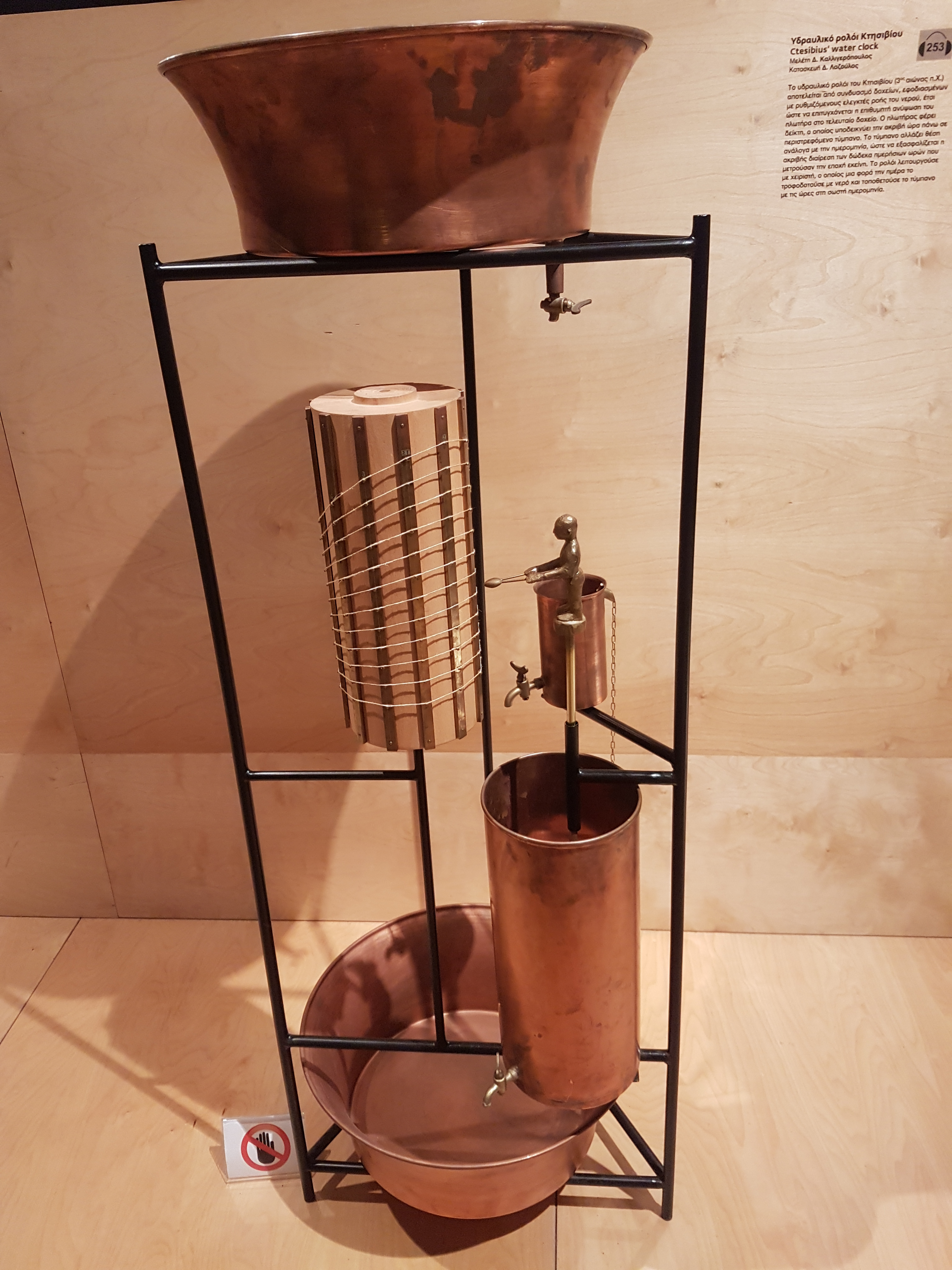
Hydraulic clock of Ctesibius, reconstruction at the Technological Museum of Thessaloniki

== Reputation ==
According to Diogenes Laërtius, Ctesibius was miserably poor. Laërtius details this by recounting the following concerning the philosopher Arcesilaus:

When he had gone to visit Ctesibius who was ill, seeing him in great distress from want, he secretly slipped his purse under his pillow; and when Ctesibius found it, "This," said he, "is the amusement of Arcesilaus."

Ctesibius's work is chronicled by Vitruvius, Athenaeus, Pliny the Elder, and Philo of Byzantium who repeatedly mention him, adding that the first mechanicians such as Ctesibius had the advantage of being under kings who loved fame and supported the arts. Proclus (the commentator on Euclid) and Hero of Alexandria also mention him.

In modern times, while Ctesibius isn't as well known as some other inventors of his age, he is recognized as an inventor who laid the foundation for future technological advances and engineering developments. He was recognized for his work with pneumatics to be given the title "the father of pneumatics" and his inventions have been improved upon to be used in important modern day uses.

== Commemoration ==
- In 1976, the crater on the far side of the Moon was named Ctesibius by the International Astronomical Union.
- In 1897, the genus of a soft-bodied plant beetle, was named Ctesibius by Champion, and has one described species called the Ctesibius, C. eumolpoides.

== Notes ==
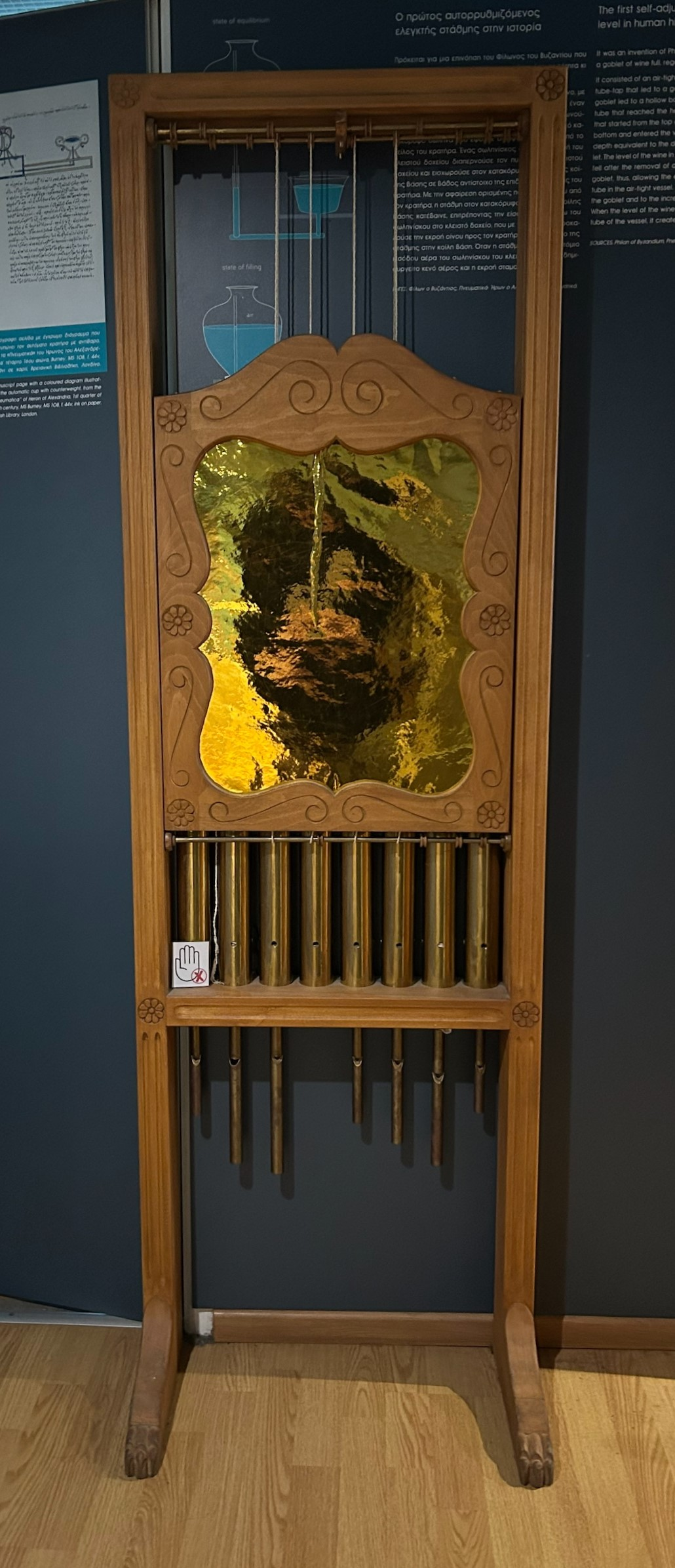
A reconstruction of the counterweight-adjustable mirror of Ctesibius in Kotsanas Museum of Ancient Greek Technology, Athens, Greece.
