= Capranica, Lazio =

Capranica
- Comune
- Comune di Capranica
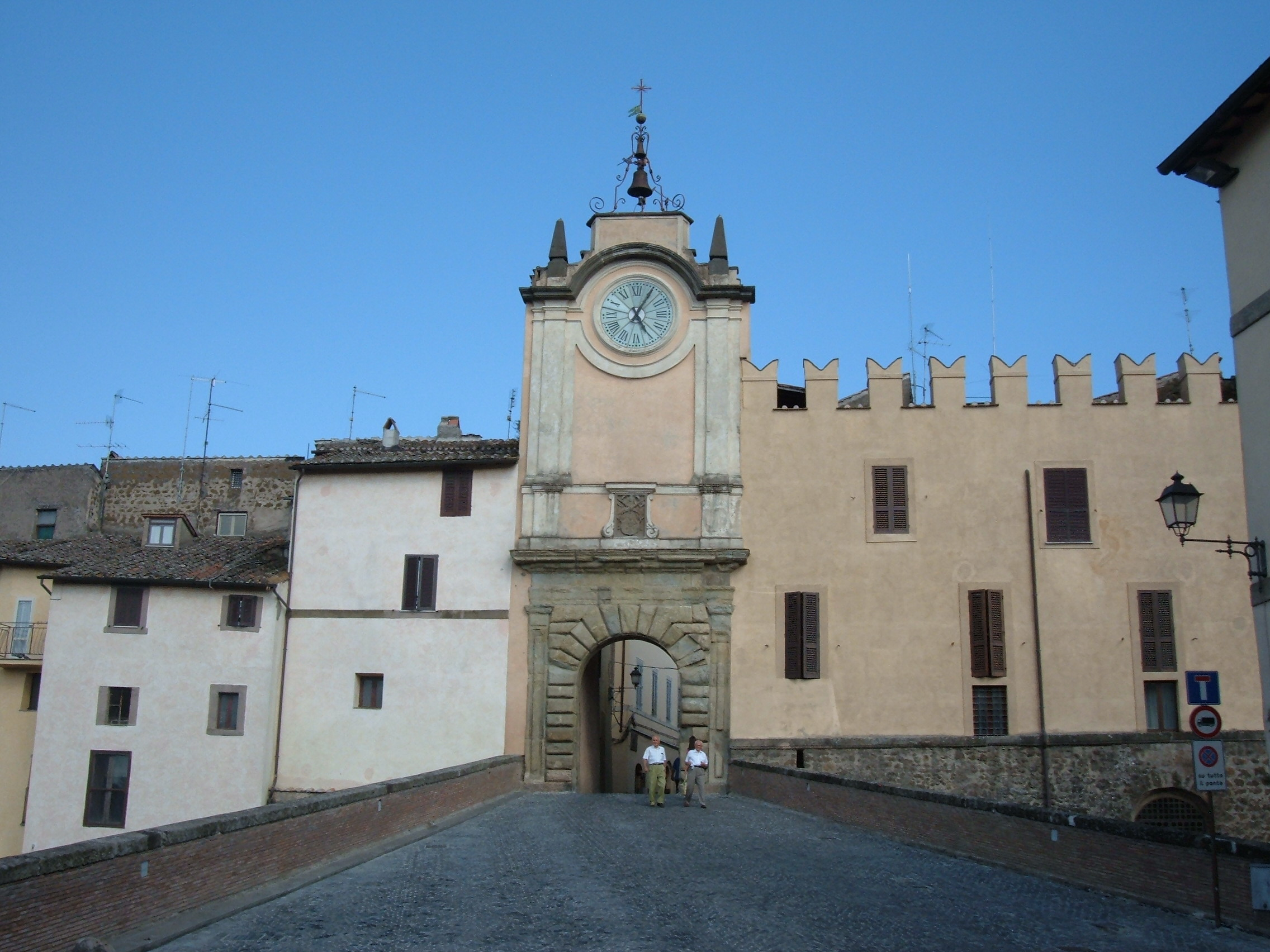

- Coat of arms

- Location within Italy Location within Lazio
- Coordinates: 42°15′N 12°10′E
- Country: Italy
- Region: Lazio
- Province: Viterbo (VT)

Government
  - Mayor: Pietro Nocchi

Area
  - Total: 40.7 km^{2} (15.7 sq mi)
- Elevation: 370 m (1,210 ft)

Population (31 December 2004)
  - Total: 5,871
  - Density: 144/km^{2} (374/sq mi)
- Demonym: Capranichesi
- Time zone: UTC+1 (CET)
  - Summer (DST): UTC+2 (CEST)
- Postal code: 01012
- Dialing code: 0761
- Website: Official website

Capranica (Capranichese: Caprà) is a comune (municipality) in the Province of Viterbo in the Italian region Lazio, located about 55 kilometres (34 mi) northwest of GRA (Grande Raccordo Anulare, Rome's orbital motorway), 66 kilometres (41 mi) from Rome’s centre, and 24.5 kilometres (15.2 mi) southeast of Viterbo.

== Geography ==
The municipality of Capranica lies at the foot of extinct volcanic mountains, the Cimini and Sabatini. The landscape of the area is volcanic - hills interspersed with wooded gorges, deeply imbedded rivers, hot springs, ancient villages and towns on rocky tuff. About 6 km (3 mi) to the north of Capranica is the crater-lake Vico; at 510 m (1,670 ft) above sea level it is one of the highest major Italian lakes. South of the town, 17 km (11 mi) away is another crater lake, Bracciano, with a perimeter of about 32 kilometres (20 mi); this was ancient Rome’s water supply and is still used for this purpose as one in a system.

Capranica is situated on a hill overlooking the Sutri valley, on Via Cassia—the northward road of the Roman Empire, which was probably constructed in the second century BC. It borders the municipalities of Barbarano Romano, Bassano Romano, Ronciglione, Sutri, Vejano, Vetralla. There is a commuter train from Capranica Scalo station to Rome and Viterbo. The beauty of the area, the proximity of lakes, nature parks and archaeological parks, hot springs and its convenient distance from the capital and airports attract Italian tourists, especially those from Rome. Many Romans own second homes in Capranica where luxurious properties are numerous. However, foreign tourists visit Capranica much less frequently than Italian.

The town of Capranica consists of three distinct parts. The two old areas of the town sit atop a tuff rock between deeply eroded valleys. Castrovecchio is the medieval and oldest part of Capranica. Its narrow, winding streets, small piazzas and noble palazzi are guarded by precipitous drops and formidable defence walls within two main gates: Porta San Pietro on the east, built into a wall high above the Via Cassia, and Porta del Ponte (dell’Orologio) on the west, where it blends with the ancient Anguillara castle. Federico Fellini shot a small scene for his famous film La dolce vita just outside Castrovecchio beneath the Porta del Ponte. To the west of this gate stretches the Renaissance (1380–1600) section of Capranica; it is closed off from the newest section of the town, which lies outside the town walls, with the 17th century gate, Porta Sant’Antonio. Via Francigena, the great medieval pilgrimage route, which led from the English cathedral city of Canterbury through Switzerland and France to Rome, still runs alongside Capranica’s town walls and precipitous escarpments, just below them, and pilgrims still walk along it today.

== Industry ==
Agriculture is the important industry in the area. Italy is the second largest hazelnut-producing country in the world and 28% of its hazelnuts come from here; hazelnut plantations are a common sight wherever one drives, to or from Capranica. There are also market gardens, fruit orchards, olive groves, and dairy and sheep farms.

== History ==
Capranica lies in the historic area of Tuscia, which is the ancient name for Southern Etruria, the land of the Etruscans and the heartland of the greatest civilisation in pre-Roman and early Roman Italy (9th-3rd century BC). The Etruscans left an abundance of archaeological remains, mostly necropoles, all around Capranica: in Sutri, Barbarano Romano, Blera, Tarquinia, Viterbo etc. An unusual site is that of two tombs, each with two chambers, in a partially levelled tumulus in the fields of Valle Cappellana, on the road between Cura and Blera, 15 km to the north of Capranica; one of them has a carved beam-ceiling, grooved columns with carved Etruscan doric capitals and square bases, and three decorated deposition beds. Although these and other fascinating and evocative Etruscan places are within easy reach from Capranica, nothing has yet been found in the town itself although its position, on the brow of the only link between southern and central Etruria, was of strategic importance.

Legend has it that in the 8th century AD goatherds from the village of Vicus Matrini fled a Lombard invasion and settled on the tuff hill, which they chose for the safety, beauty and healthy air it offered. This settlement became known as Capranica, capra meaning goat.

Charlemagne, king of the Franks and of Italy, the founder of the Carolingian Empire, crossed Capranica in the year 800 on his way to Rome, where he was crowned Emperor of the Romans. He may have followed the Via Francigena, of which the English-born Bishop Willibald of Eichstätt in Bavaria had made the first mention in his Hodoeporicon, a travel account dated to about 725.

Not much was heard about Capranica for a long time afterwards. When Capranica is mentioned again in the historical record, it is in connection with warring factions, bandit attacks, bloodshed and destruction. Francesco Petrarca, in English known as Petrarch (1304–1374), a scholar, poet and one of the earliest humanists, spent a month in Capranica as a guest of the noble House of Anguillara and wrote of bold farmers there who, as they worked their fields, always had a sword and a spear lying in the furrows ready to defend themselves and their homes.

The powerful Anquillara family made Capranica the centre of their fiefdom. Their palace is still there, now adapted to house many more people. The Anguillaras were patrons of art and builders of churches. In one of them, the church of San Francesco in the Renaissance part of the town, were buried the twins Francesco (d. 1406) and Nicola (d. 1408). The marble effigy on the tomb shows two sleeping youths dressed in armour, swords in their hands.

Echoes of the French Revolution (1789–99) reached the area and caused unrest and destruction in nearby towns of Ronciglione, Bassano Romano and Monterano but Capranica was not affected. The Napoleonic regime (1804–15) brought improved laws and administration to Capranica but also military conscription, forced participation in distant and bloody wars, and the deportation of those who remained loyal to the old regime.

As all this was happening, Giuseppe Mazzini (1805 –1872) politician, journalist and activist for the unification of Italy, and an advocate of a United States of Europe a century before the European Union began to take shape, passed through Capranica on his way to Rome and expressed much admiration for the volcanic landscape and the Etruscan rock tombs alongside the road.

== Main sights ==
Sights in Capranica include

- Medieval Quarter with many townhouses, portals and palaces (Piazza del Palazzaccio, Via della Viccinella);
- San Pietro (9th century); church
- Portal of St Sebastian’s hospital, which belonged to a 13th-century church of San Giovanni. It had probably been previously recovered from the church of Sancta Maria in Vicus Matrini
- San Francesco (13–16th century) church with Michelangelo-style frescos and a tomb effigy by Pietro da Gualdo of Francesco and Nicola Anguillara, who died in 1406 and 1408
- San Giovanni (Capranica’s cathedral) church reconstructed in its current form in 1800–1840 but retaining its 16th-century dome and the original 13th-century bell tower
- San Rocco (15th century), church now housing the Museum of the Confraternity
- Santa Maria: Neoclassical church designed by the architect Virginio Vespignani in 1867. It is home to several paintings: the Benedictory Saviour (12–13th century); a triptych depicting St Terentian, St Roch, St Sebastian (15–16th century); and the statue of Madonna delle Grazie (1808);
- Palazzo Accoramboni (17th century), now the seat of local administration;
- Anguillara Torrione Castle with its Clock Bridge and portal (Porta del Ponte dell’Orologio);
- Madonna del Piano: church built in 1559–87, its splendid façade is attributed to Giacomo Barozzi da Vignola, the author of The Five Orders of Architecture, a most successful architectural textbooks ever written;
- Porta di Sant’Antonio (St Anthony’s Gate) erected in the 17th century by Cardinal Antonio Barberini
- Palazzo Montenero-Sansoni, erected in the second half of the 18th century by a French doctor of medicine, Charles Thierry, as sanatorium for treatment with mineral waters. Thierry had analysed the properties of mineral water in Capranica and in 1766 published his work as Les Eaux Minerales de Capranica.
- Shrine of Our Lady of Mentorella
