= House of Anguillara =

Coat of Arms

Anguillara were a baronial family of Latium, especially powerful in Rome and in the current province of Viterbo during the Middle Ages and the early Renaissance.

The Anguillara were of Norman descent. They most likely took, or gave, their name from the city of Anguillara Sabazia, on the Lake Bracciano. The name itself could refer to the Italian word anguilla (eel), or, as claimed by some, to a Roman villa (villa angularia) on a corner (Latin: angulum) of the Lake.

A first Count Ramone Anguillara is recorded as a probably legendary enemy of the Popes. In 1090 is known a Gherardo, lord of Anguillara, who was allied with the Prefetti di Vico against the commune of Rome. His successors were John, who took Santa Severa, and Niccolò, who conquered Tolfa in 1146. In 1186 Pandolfo I started a long struggle with the Vicos for the control of northern Latium and met the Henry VI at Orvieto, also hosting him in 1191.

Pandolfo II sided with Henry's son, Frederick II, during the siege of Viterbo (1243), but was captured by the Papal troops and imprisoned at Ronciglione. The Anguillara fief was thus seized by Pietro di Vico, who reigned there until Pandolfo's return in 1246.

The chaotic situation caused by the move of the Papal seat to Avignon led the family to move their headquarters in Rome and Capranica, where Orso dell'Anguillara, Senator of Rome, hosted the poet Petrarch in 1336. Orso's mother was a member of the powerful Orsini, and married a member of the Colonna family, thus establishing the Anguillara as one of the most important Roman families.

Orso was succeeded by Pietro, Dolce and Everso II, who was a famous condottiero and conquered Vetralla, Caprarola and Santa Pupa. His son Francesco inherited his fame of tyranny and unloyalty: he was excommunicated and imprisoned in Castel Sant'Angelo, while all the family's possession were acquired by the Apostolic Chamber under Pope Paul II. Deifobo, the other Everso's son, managed to regain his lands, which he kept until his death in 1490. In that year Pope Innocent VIII assigned the Anguillara lands to his nephew Franceschetto Cybo.

The last notable member of the family is the condottiero Renzo da Ceri, who fought in the defence of Rome during the Sack of 1527. The family became extinct in the 18th century.
