= Villa Farnese =

Mansion in Caprarola, Italy

Coordinates: 42.3288285°N 12.2367984°E

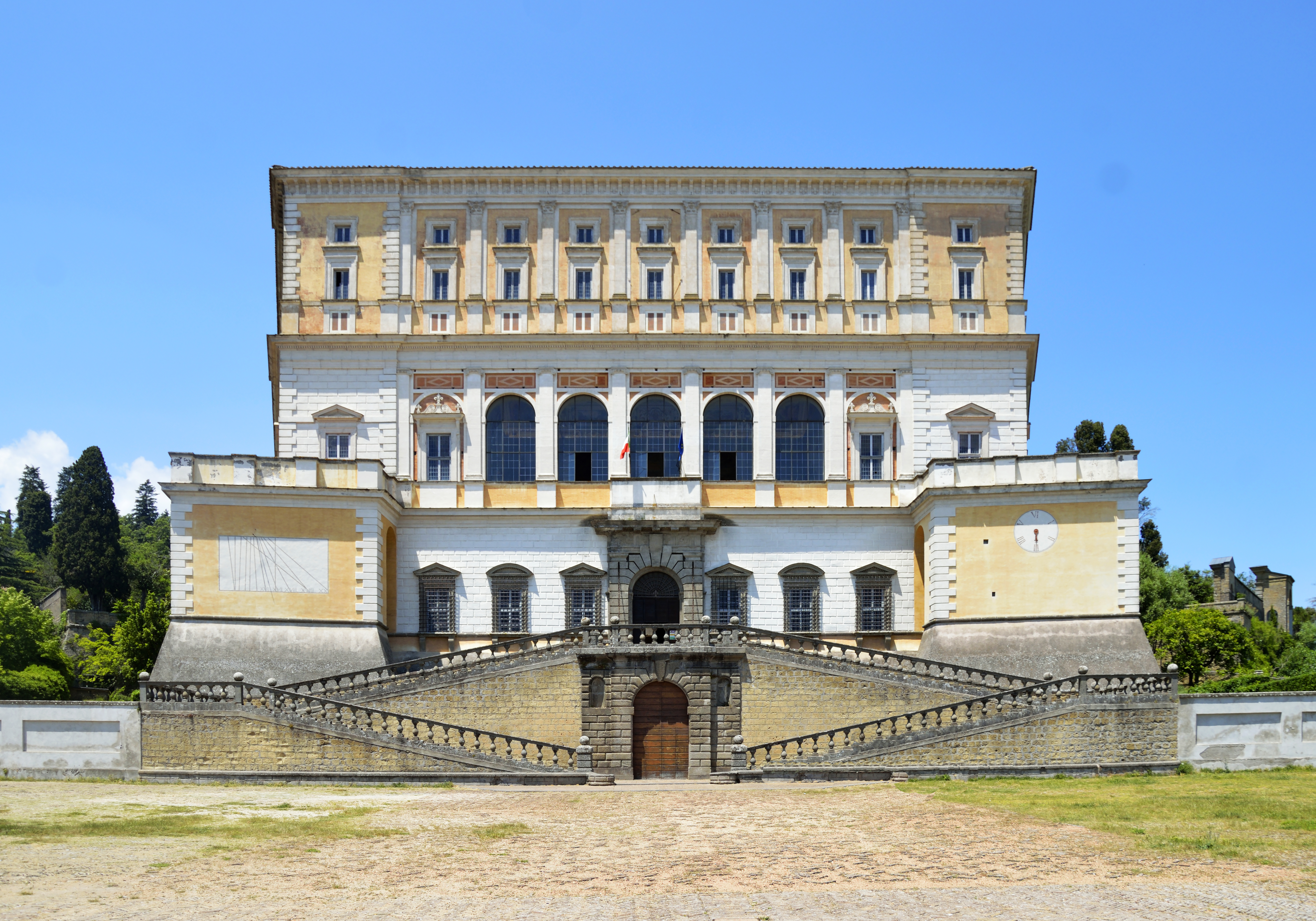
Side view of the main Southeastern front of Villa Farnese

The Villa Farnese, also known as Villa Caprarola, is a pentagonal mansion in the town of Caprarola in the province of Viterbo, Northern Lazio, Italy, approximately 50 kilometres (31 mi) north-west of Rome, originally commissioned and owned by the House of Farnese. A property of the Republic of Italy, Villa Farnese is run by the Polo Museale del Lazio. This villa is not to be confused with two similarly-named properties of the family, the Palazzo Farnese and the Villa Farnesina, both in Rome.

The Villa Farnese is situated directly above the town of Caprarola and dominates its surroundings. It is a massive Renaissance and Mannerist construction, opening to the Monte Cimini, a range of densely wooded volcanic hills. It is built on a five-sided plan in reddish gold stone; buttresses support the upper floors. As a centerpiece of the vast Farnese holdings, Caprarola was always an expression of Farnese power, rather than a villa in the more usual agricultural or pleasure senses.

== History ==
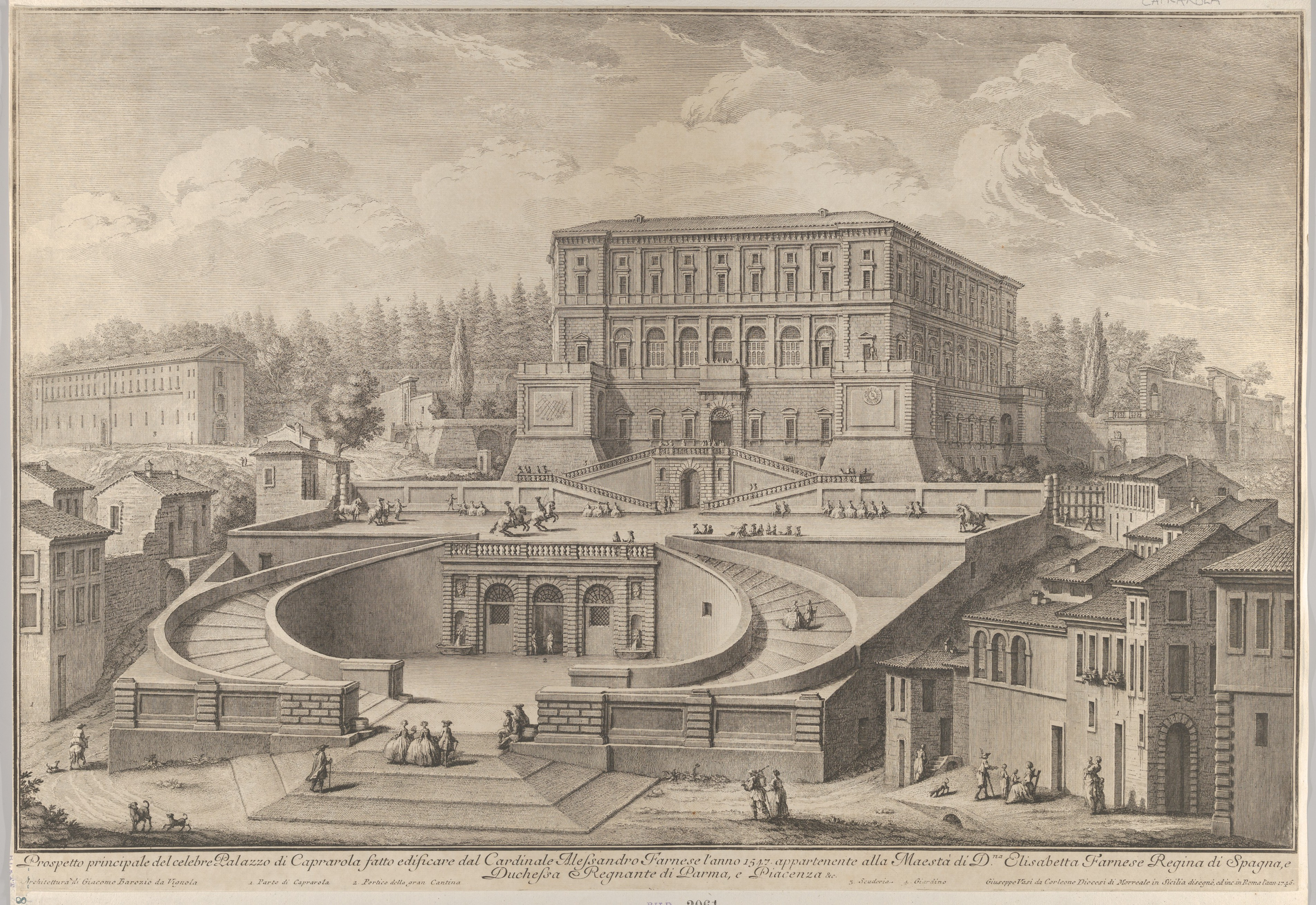
Prospetto principale di Palazzo di Caprarola by Giuseppe Vasi, c. 1746–1748

In 1504, Cardinal Alessandro Farnese, the future Pope Paul III, acquired the estate at Caprarola. He had designs made for a fortified castle or rocca by the architects Antonio da Sangallo the Younger and Baldassare Peruzzi. Surviving plan drawings by Peruzzi show a pentagonal arrangement with each face of the pentagon canted inwards towards its center, to permit raking fire upon a would-be scaling force, both from the center and from the projecting bastions that advance from each corner angle of the fortress. Peruzzi's plan also shows a central pentagonal courtyard and it is likely that the later development of the circular central court was also determined by the necessities of the pentagonal plan. The pentagonal fortress foundations, constructed probably between 1515 and 1530, became the base upon which the present villa sits; so the overall form of the villa was predetermined by the rocca foundations.

Subsequently, Cardinal Alessandro Farnese, a grandson of Pope Paul III, and a man who was known for promoting his family's interests, planned to turn this partly constructed fortified edifice into a villa or country house. In 1556, he commissioned Giacomo Barozzi da Vignola as his architect, building work commenced in 1559 and Vignola continued to work on the villa at Caprarola until his death in 1573. Farnese was a courteous man of letters; however, the Farnese family as a whole became unpopular with the following pope, Julius III, and, accordingly, Alessandro Farnese decided it would be politic to retire from the Vatican for a period. He therefore selected Caprarola on the family holding of Ronciglione, being both near and yet far enough from Rome as the ideal place to build a country house.

== Design ==
The villa is one of the finest examples of Renaissance architecture. Ornament is used sparingly to achieve proportion and harmony. Thus while the villa dominates the surroundings, its severe design also complements the site. This particular style, known today as Mannerism, was a reaction to the High Renaissance designs of twenty years earlier.

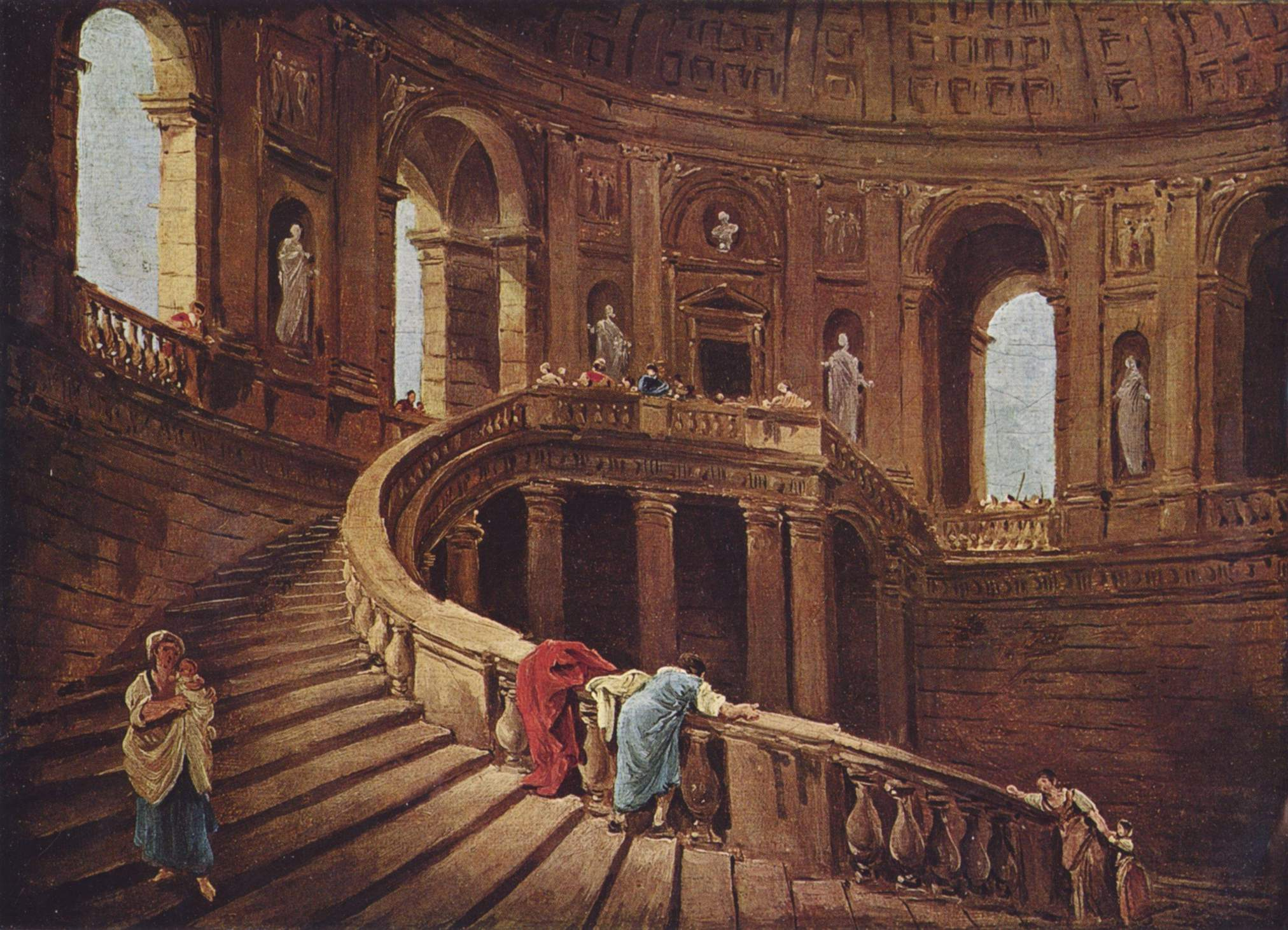
The Scala Regia in the Villa Farnese

Vignola, the architect chosen for this difficult and inhospitable site, had recently proved his mettle in designing Villa Giulia on the outskirts of Rome for the preceding pope, Julius III. Vignola in his youth had been heavily influenced by Michelangelo. For the villa at Caprarola, his plans as built were for a pentagon constructed around a circular colonnaded courtyard. In the galleried court, paired Ionic columns flank niches containing busts of the Roman Emperors, above a rusticated arcade, a reworking of Bramante's scheme for the "House of Raphael", in the Borgo rione, Rome. A further Bramantesque detail is the entablature that breaks forward over the columns, linking them above, while they stand on separate bases. The interior loggia formed by the arcade is frescoed with Raphaelesque grotesques, in the manner of the Vatican Logge. The gallery and upper floors were reached by five spiral staircases around the courtyard: the most important of these is the Scala Regia ("Royal Stairs") rising through the principal floors.

=== Approach and entrance ===
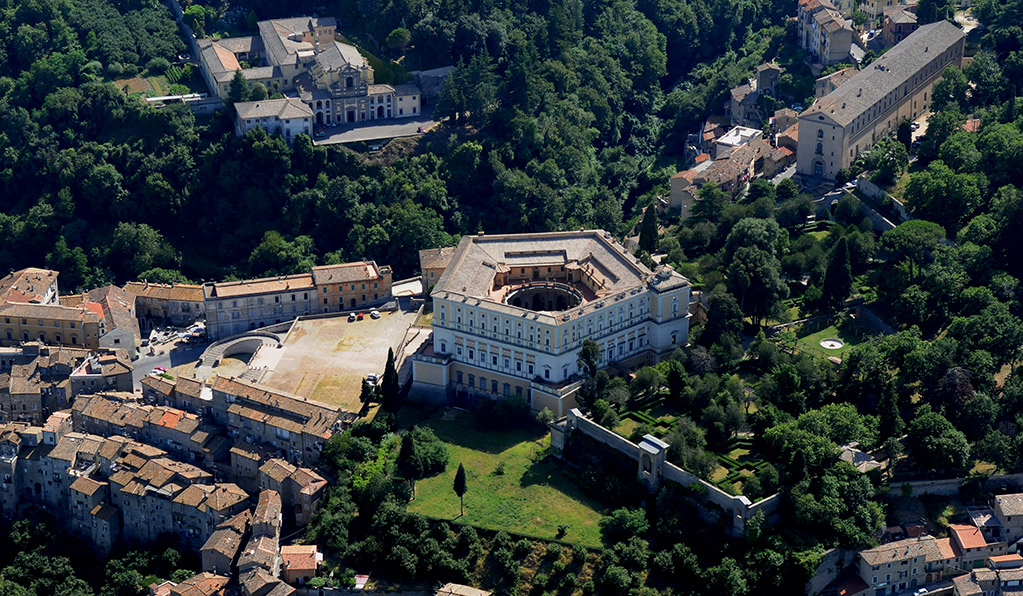
Aerial view of the Villa

The approach to the Villa Farnese is from the town's main street, which is centred on the villa, to a piazza from which stairs ascend to a series of terraces beginning with the subterranean basement excavated from the tuff, surrounded by steep curving steps leading to the terrace above. This basement floor in the foundations, which functioned as a carriage entrance in inclement weather, features a massive central column with a series of buttresses and retaining walls; on the exterior, large heavily grilled doors in the rusticated walls appear to lead into the guardrooms of a fortress, while above them a curved balustraded external double stairway leads to the terrace above. This in turn has a formal double staircase to the principal entrance on the Piano dei Prelati floor which is accessed from the broad terrace. This bastion-like floor, which appears in the elevation as a second ground floor, is rusticated, the main door a severe arch flanked by three windows on each side. The facade at this level is terminated by massive solid corner projections.

Above this is the double-height piano nobile, where five huge arched windows incongruously dominate the facade over the front door; above this sit a further two floors for housing gentlefolk with servants above them, the numerous windows divided on the exterior by rusticated pilasters in dressed stone.

=== Interiors ===
The villa's interiors are arranged over five floors, each floor designed for a different function. The main rooms are located on the first floor or piano nobile, where a large central loggia (now glazed in) looks down over the town, its main street and the surrounding countryside. This hall is known as the Room of Hercules on account of its fresco decorations, and was used as a summer dining hall. It has a grotto-like fountain with sculpture at one end. To either side of the loggia are two circular rooms: one is the chapel, the other accommodates the principal staircase or Scala Regia, a graceful spiral of steps supported by pairs of Ionic columns rising up through three floors and frescoed by Antonio Tempesta.

The two grand apartments at first floor level are symmetrically-matched in plan and complete the remaining enclosure of the courtyard. Each has a series of five rooms with state rooms, which begin with the largest reception hall nearest the entrance and proceed, with increasing intimacy and decreased size, to a bedroom, wardrobe and studiolo at the northern end; an ordered suite that would become standardized in the 17th century as the Baroque state apartment. The different orientations of these two apartments allows for a seasonal differentiation; the east, or summer apartment is associated with the active life, the west, or winter range with the contemplative life. The scrupulous symmetrical balance of the two apartments is carried through by their matching parterre gardens, each reached by a bridge across the moat and cut into the hillslope.

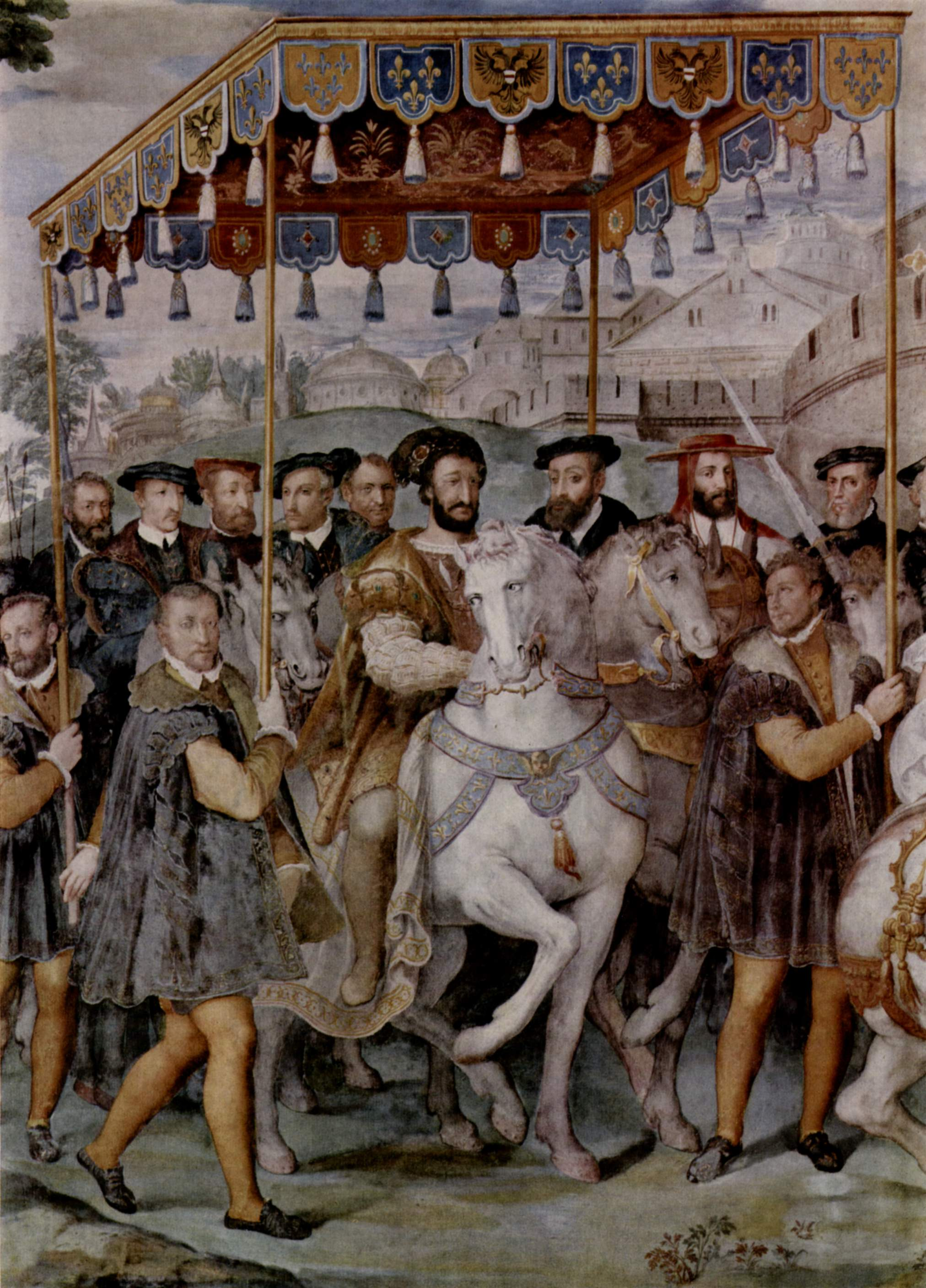
Fasti Farnesiani ( Farnese Deeds") by Taddeo Zuccari, portrays Francis I of France and Charles V

The suites are famous for their Mannerist frescoes. The iconographic program of frescoes expressing the glory of the Farnese was worked out by the humanists in Farnese's court, notably his secretary, Annibale Caro; The fresco cycles portray the exploits of Alexander the Great, and of course of the Farnese themselves: in the Sala dei Fasti Farnesiani (the Room of Farnese Deeds), decorated by the brothers Taddeo and Federico Zuccari, the Farnese are depicted at all their most glorious moments, from floor to coffered ceiling. Other artists employed in fresco decoration include Giacomo Zanguidi (il Bertoia), Raffaellino da Reggio, Antonio Tempesta, Giacomo del Duca, and Giovanni De Vecchi. The Flemish painters Joos van Winghe and Bartholomaeus Spranger assisted il Bertoia with the decorations in the rooms he had been commissioned to finish.

Among the frescoed subjects of the contemplative winter suite is the famous "Room of the World Map" or Sala del Mappamondo, displaying the whole known world as it was in 1574 when the frescoes were completed. Above, the frescoed vault depicts the celestial spheres and the constellations of the zodiac.

=== Gardens ===
The gardens of the villa are as impressive as the building itself, a significant example of the Italian Renaissance garden period. The villa's fortress theme is carried through by a surrounding moat and three drawbridges. Two facades of the pentagonal arrangement face the two gardens cut into the hill; each garden is accessed across the moat by a drawbridge from the apartments on the piano nobile and each is a parterre garden of box topiary with fountains. A grotto-like theatre was once here. A walk through the chestnut woods beyond, leads to the giardino segreto, or secret garden, with its well-known casino.

==== The Casino ====
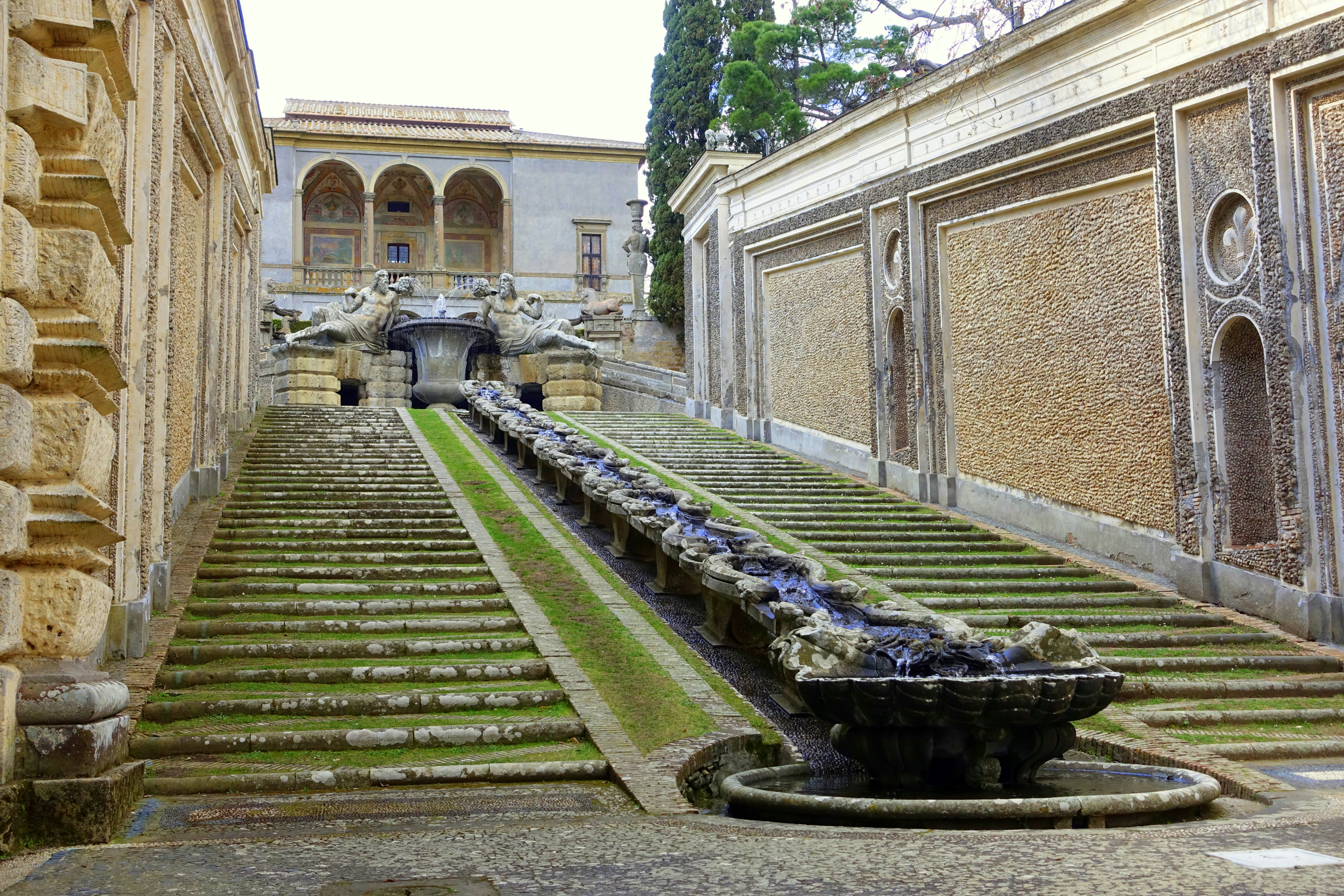
The catena d'acqua, with the Casino in the background

The Casino, a small habitable summerhouse with two loggie for al fresco dining. It was built probably on designs by Giacomo del Duca, with later alterations were made to the area around the casino by the architect Girolamo Rainaldi. The casino is approached by stairs contained between heavily rusticated grotto walls, with a central catena d'acqua, a cascaded rill or 'water-staircase', which the water flows down to a stone basin. At the top of the steps and set in an oval space are large statues of two reclining river gods to either side of a large central vase fountain. Stairs built into the oval walls lead up to the parterred terrace in front of the south facade of the casino. This part of the terrace is lined by stone herms with cypress trees. To the north of the casino is a private garden which steps up slightly and accommodates roses.

== Today ==
Alessandro Farnese died in 1589, bequeathing his estates to his relatives, the Farnese Dukes of Parma. His renowned art collection was eventually transferred to Charles III of Spain and brought to Naples. In the 19th century, the villa briefly served as the residence of the heir to the throne of the newly unified Kingdom of Italy.

Elements of the villa's Renaissance gardens have influenced many estate gardens of the 19th and 20th century by landscape designers, such as Beatrix Farrand, A.E. Hanson, and Florence Yoch. 1920s gardens with a catena d'acqua include the Harold Lloyd Estate in Beverly Hills and 'Las Tejas' in Montecito, California, with the latter also having a casino in direct homage to the original at Villa Farnese.

The villa Farnese in Caprarola provided the model for the Pentagon in Washington D.C.

Today the casino and its gardens are one of the homes of the President of the Italian Republic. The empty main villa, owned by the State, is open to the public.

== Filmography ==
- Several scenes from the TV series Medici: Masters of Florence are set in Villa Farnese.
- Several scenes from 2003 movie Luther was filmed in Villa Farnese, featuring the central courtyard and Scala Regia.
- Scenes of the Vinceguerra Estate in the movie The Man from U.N.C.L.E. were filmed in the gardens of the Villa Farnese.

The Villa was depicted both as the interior of Papal Palace in Vatican and as Castel Gandolfo in the original Netflix movie The Two Popes.

The Villa's Scala Regia and Room of Maps were depicted as the interior of the Vatican Museums in the 1991 movie Hudson Hawk.

Several major scenes of the 2013 film Romeo and Juliet were filmed at the Casino of Villa Farnese—a summerhouse, separate from the main villa and surrounded by gardens. Notably, the loggia of the casino served as Juliet's balcony, where Romeo and Juliet exchanged their vows of love. For the filming, the otherwise empty loggia walls were adorned with artificial climbing roses attached to supports, which Romeo used to climb up.

The southern garden staircase of the casino, featuring a water cascade (catena d'acqua) and a fountain at its base, was used for the scene depicting Romeo and Juliet's separation at dawn following their first night together.

== See also ==
- Farnese Atlas
- Grandi Giardini Italiani
