= Lake Vico =

- Lago di Vico (Italian)
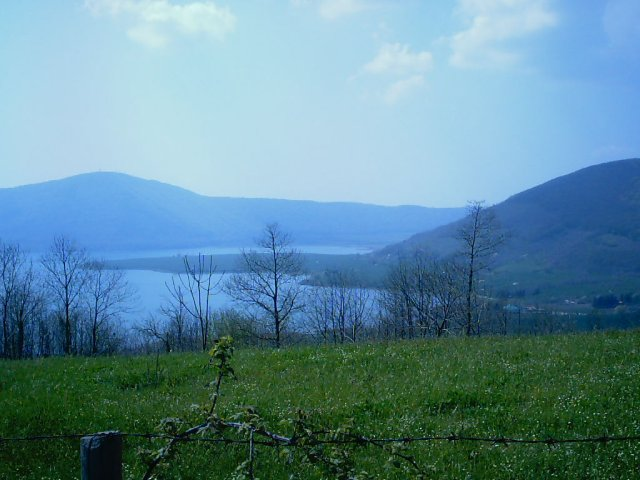

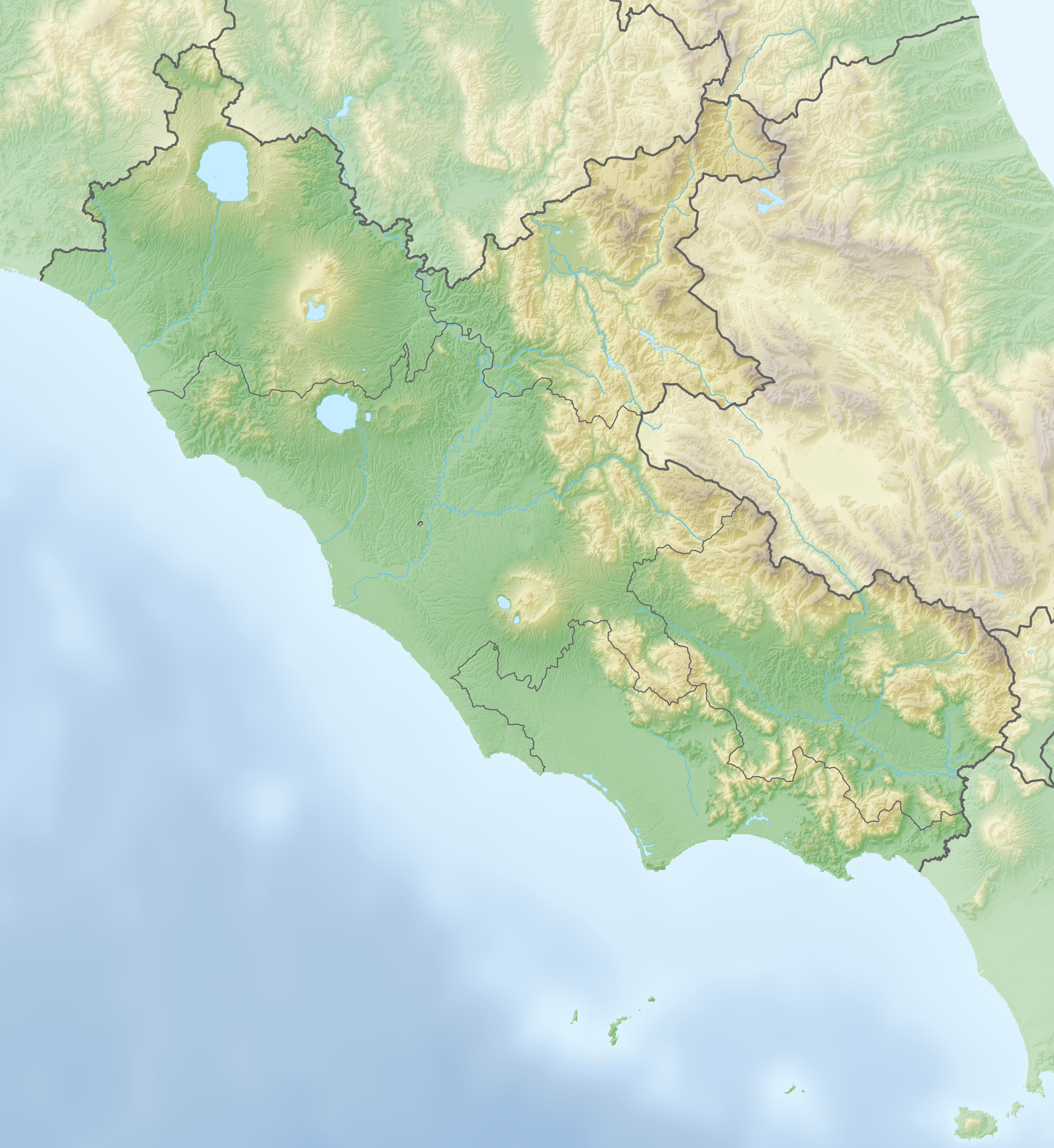
- Location within Lazio
- Location: Lazio, Italy
- Coordinates: 42°19′N 12°10′E
- Type: volcanic crater lake
- Primary outflows: Rio Vicano
- Catchment area: 40.95 km^{2} (15.81 sq mi)
- Basin countries: Italy
- Surface area: 12.93 km^{2} (4.99 sq mi)
- Average depth: 22.2 m (73 ft)
- Max. depth: 48.5 m (159 ft)
- Surface elevation: 510 m (1,670 ft)

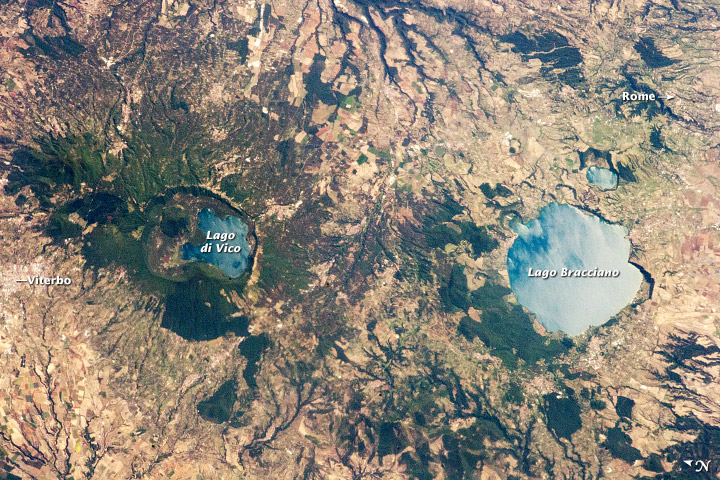
View from space of Lake Vico and surroundings including Rome

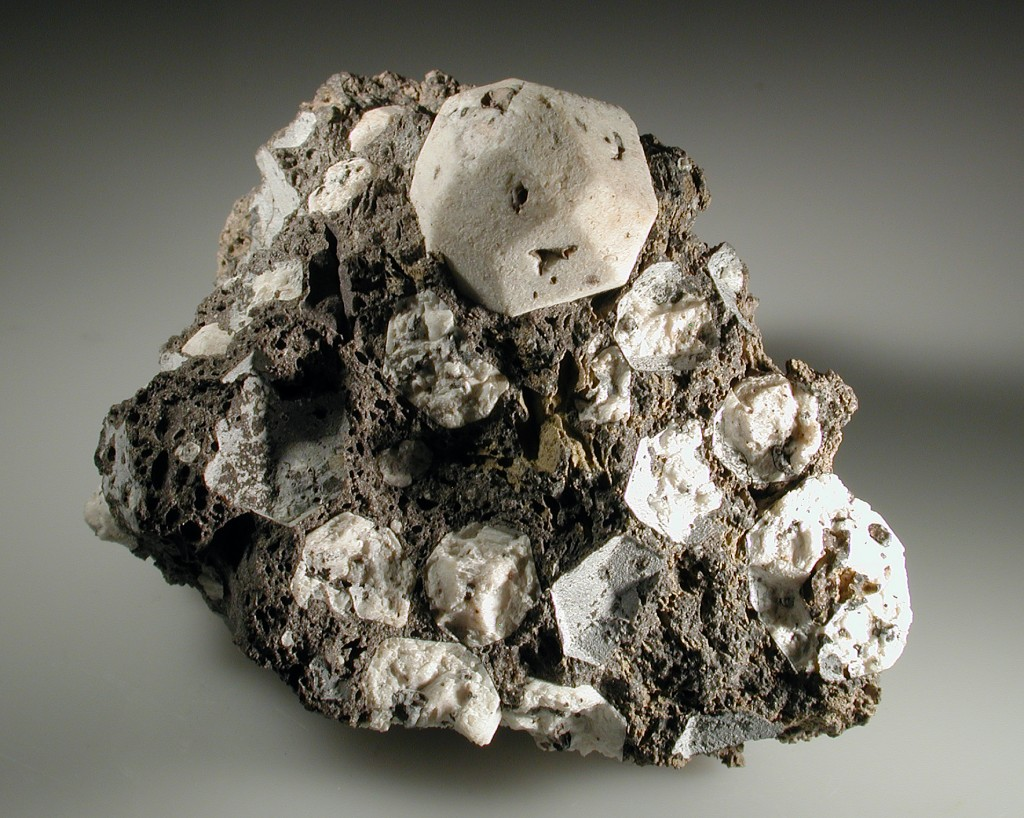
White crystals of leucite in lava from Poggio Nibbio, Lake Vico

Lake Vico (Italian: Lago di Vico, pronounced [ˈviːko]) is a caldera lake in northern Lazio, central Italy. It is one of the highest major Italian lakes, with an altitude of 510 m. Administratively, it is part of the municipalities of Caprarola and Ronciglione.

The lake is surrounded by the Cimini Hills, in particular by the Fogliano (965 m) and Venere (851 m) mountains. It is part of the Lake Vico Natural Reserve.

According to legend, the lake was created by Hercules, who defied the local inhabitants by wielding his club. When he did this, a stream sprang up and formed the lake.

== Geology ==
Lake Vico occupies the central caldera of Vico Volcano. A volcanic cone was built up in a series of eruptions that occurred 305,000 to 258,000 years ago. Later, the eruption of voluminous pyroclastic flows, and volcanic ash, caused the progressive collapse of the volcanic cone, which created the caldera, in which Lake Vico now lies, by about 138,000 years ago.

== History ==
The Vicano river is the original outlet from Lake Vico, it flowed down the valley towards the Treja River, flowing out from the point where the caldera wall is less elevated. At an unknown time in the Roman era, the waters were made to flow into the Vicano river through an artificial conduit. This was then reactivated in the 16th century with a series of interventions carried out by the Farnese family. Some scholars have theorised that the lake level has been artificially lowered since the Etruscan era, but the Farnese tunnel is the only one currently known to archaeologists. It is a remarkable tunnel dug into the tuff in the Roman era with an irregular shape (to reduce the outlet pressure). The conduit, whose vault is supported by courses of bricks, receives the waters from a lock dating back to the Farnese era, runs for about 400 meters to exit on the opposite side of the mountain ridge, in the Vicano river gorge. The waters of the outflow, which have been below the threshold for a couple of years due to very low rainfall, flow out of the lake through an artificial circular-section tunnel built in the 1990s.

Since ancient times, the construction of the tunnel has allowed a significant lowering of the water level, transforming part of the lake, and especially the entire northern area of the caldera (the so-called "Pantanacce") into an agricultural landscape. The geography of the lake that we can see today is therefore different from the original one: Mount Venere, born following the last phase of activity of the Vicano volcano (ended 90,000 years ago) which now rises in the northern part of the basin giving it the characteristic "horseshoe" shape, was probably a peninsula and the surface area of the body of water was almost double that which can be measured today.

== Nature ==
The area is famous for its extensive beech forest, which is one of the most southerly in Europe. The elevation, plus the surrounding sides of the crater, create cool enough conditions for the continued survival of the trees. A large part of the northern side of the crater is a nature reserve to protect this forest.

=== Wildlife ===
An incomplete list of wildlife present in the Vico Natural Preserve include:

- Great crested grebe, symbol of the preserve
- Black kite
- Common teal
- Common toad
- Common whitefish
- Coypu
- Eurasian badger
- Eurasian coot
- Eurasian jay
- Eurasian scops owl
- Fox
- Great egret
- Grey heron
- Herman's tortoise
- Lanner falcon
- Little egret
- Northern pike
- Pine marten
- Eurasian sparrowhawk
- Squacco heron
- Tree frog
- Water rail
- Wigeon
- Eurasian wren
- Wild cat

== Nearby towns ==
- Ronciglione
- Caprarola
- Viterbo
- Vetralla
- Capranica
