= Dolce dell'Anguillara =

Dolce II dell'Anguillara (also spelled degli Anguillara) (1401 – March 1449) was an Italian condottiero, a member of the Anguillara family of northern Lazio, brother of Everso II.

In 1424 he fought against Jacopo Caldora, general of Braccio da Montone, in the battle of L'Aquila. In the 1430s he fought for Alfonso V of Aragon and for the Republic of Venice. In June 1442 Dolce was hired by Francesco Sforza to fight against the Pope, and two years later he crushed a Papal-Neapolitan force under Francesco Piccinino at Montolmo.

In 1446, after spurring the town of Nepi to rebellion, he was excommunicated by Pope Nicholas V, but he was pardoned soon afterwards. The following year he was again under Sforza, taking part in the Wars in Lombardy. In March 1449, while preparing to besiege Monza, he was ambushed by Carlo Gonzaga and fatally wounded. He died at Pavia.
