= Coffer =

Series of sunken panels in a ceiling or vault

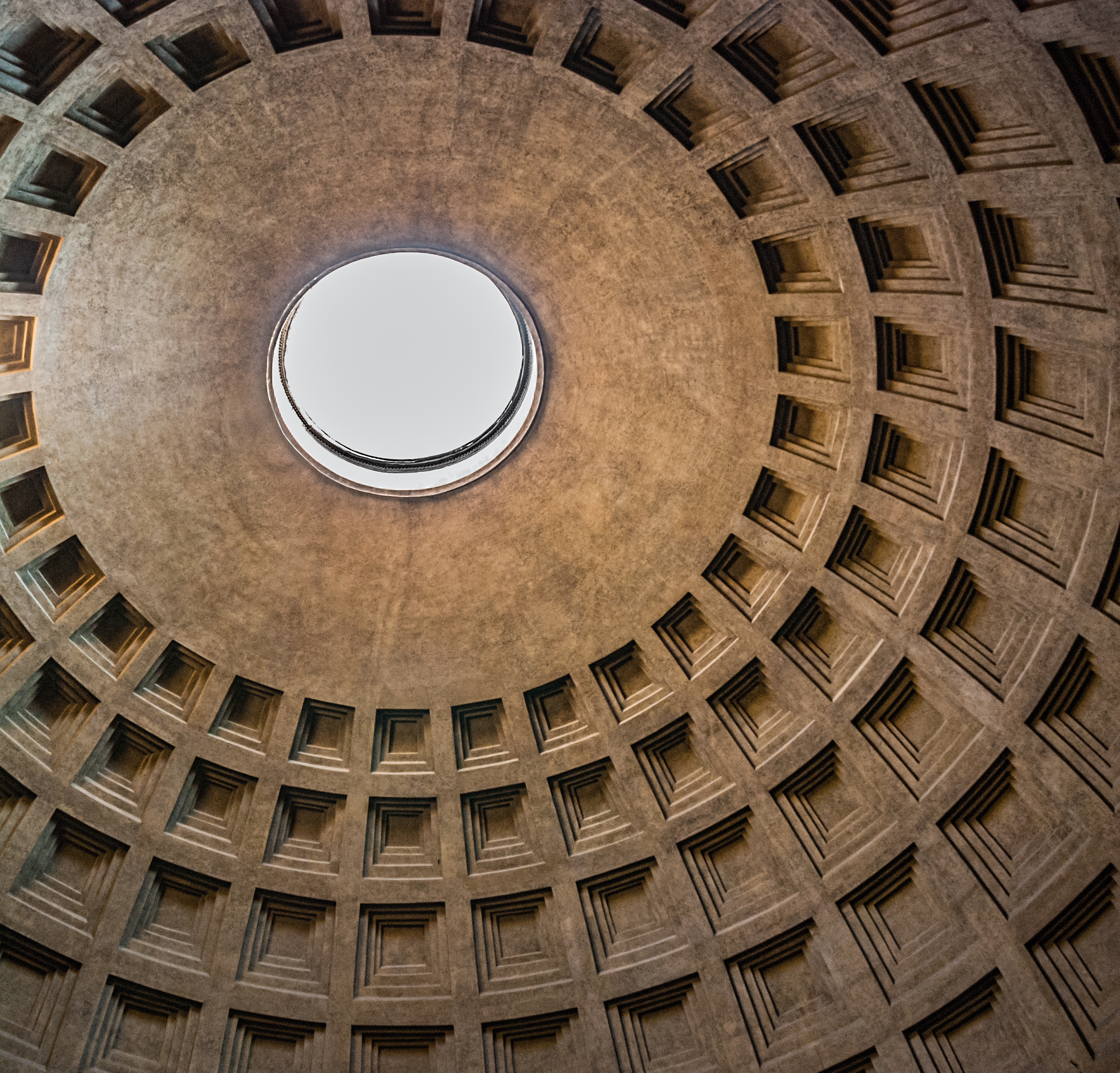
Coffering on the ceiling of the Pantheon (Rome), 126 AD

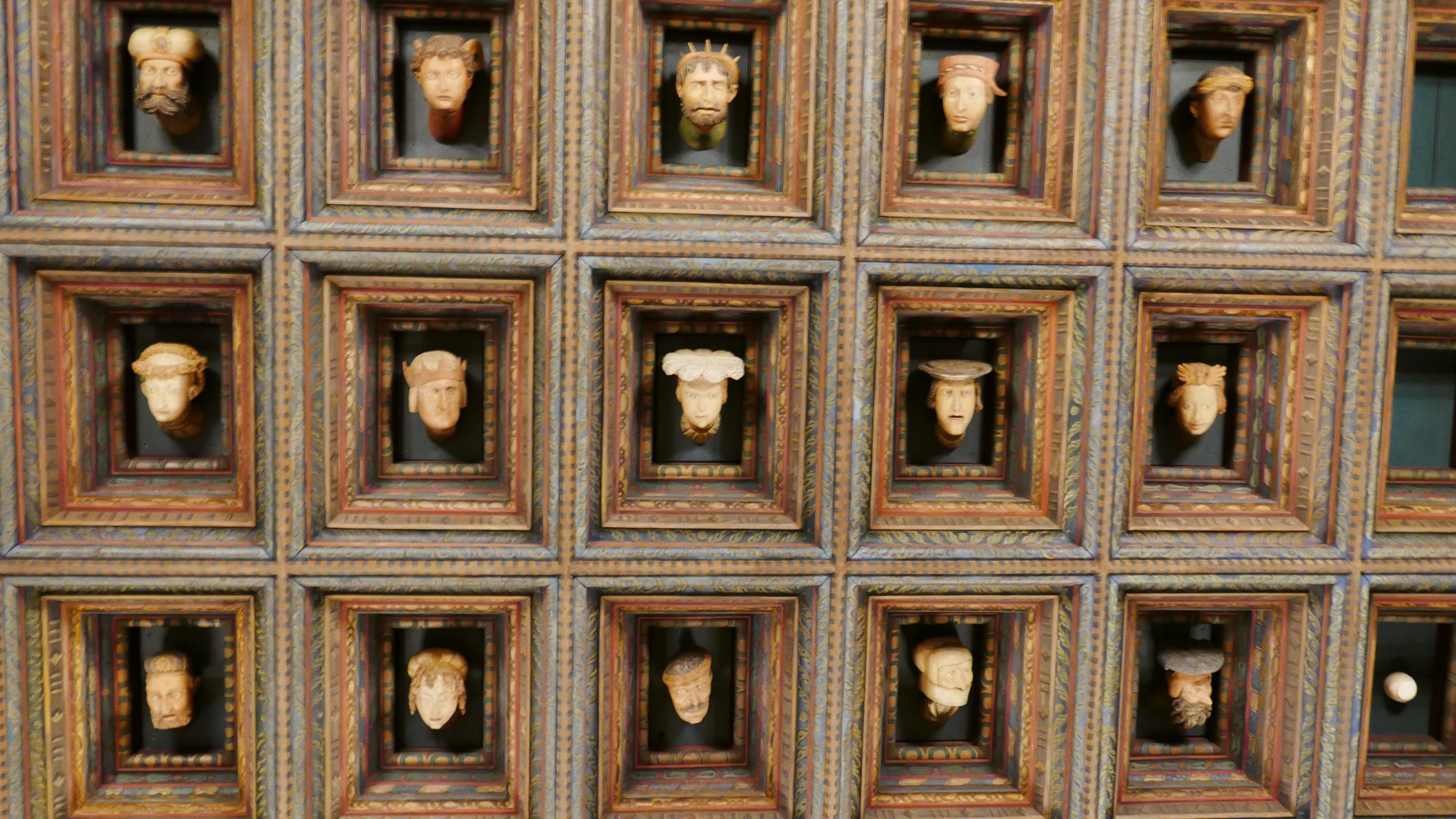
Gothic coffered ceiling with carved human heads at Wawel Castle (Kraków)

A coffer (or coffering) in architecture is a series of sunken panels in the shape of a square, rectangle, or octagon in a ceiling, soffit or vault. A series of these sunken panels was often used as decoration for a ceiling or a vault, also called caissons ("boxes"), or lacunaria ("spaces, openings"), (Note: An alternative, in a description of Domitian's audience hall by Statius, noted by Ulrich 2007:156, is laquearia, not a copyist's error, as it appears in Manilius' Astronomica (1.533).) so that a coffered ceiling can be called a lacunar ceiling: the strength of the structure is in the framework of the coffers.

== History ==
The stone coffers of the ancient Greeks (Note: An example is the main hieron at Samothrace, where stone ceiling beams of the pronaos carried a coffered ceiling of marble slabs across a span of about 6.15 m.) and Romans are the earliest surviving examples, but a seventh-century BC Etruscan chamber tomb in the necropolis of San Giuliano, which is cut in soft tufa-like stone, reproduces a ceiling with beams and cross-beams lying on them, with flat panels filling the lacunae. Coffering is known as zaojing (Chinese: 藻井; pinyin: zǎojǐng) in ancient Chinese wooden architecture.

It was thought for centuries that wooden coffers were first made by crossing the wooden beams of a ceiling in the Loire Valley châteaux of the early Renaissance. However, archaeologists working at the House of the Telephus in Herculaneum in 2012 discovered that wooden coffered ceilings were constructed in Roman times. A prominent example of Roman coffering, employed to lighten the weight of the dome, can be found in the ceiling of the rotunda dome in the Pantheon, Rome.

Experimentation with the possible shapes in coffering, which solve problems of mathematical tiling, or tessellation, were a feature of Islamic as well as Renaissance architecture. The more complicated problems of diminishing the scale of the individual coffers were presented by the requirements of curved surfaces of vaults and domes. Coffered ceilings were used in cathedrals starting with St Mark's Basilica and Santa Maria Maggiore. They spread following the reforms of the Council of Trent, as the improved acoustics and opportunity to include statues, apostolic heraldry and other religious elements in compositions with versatile shapes was thought to enhance the doctrinal purpose of a cathedral.

== Gallery ==
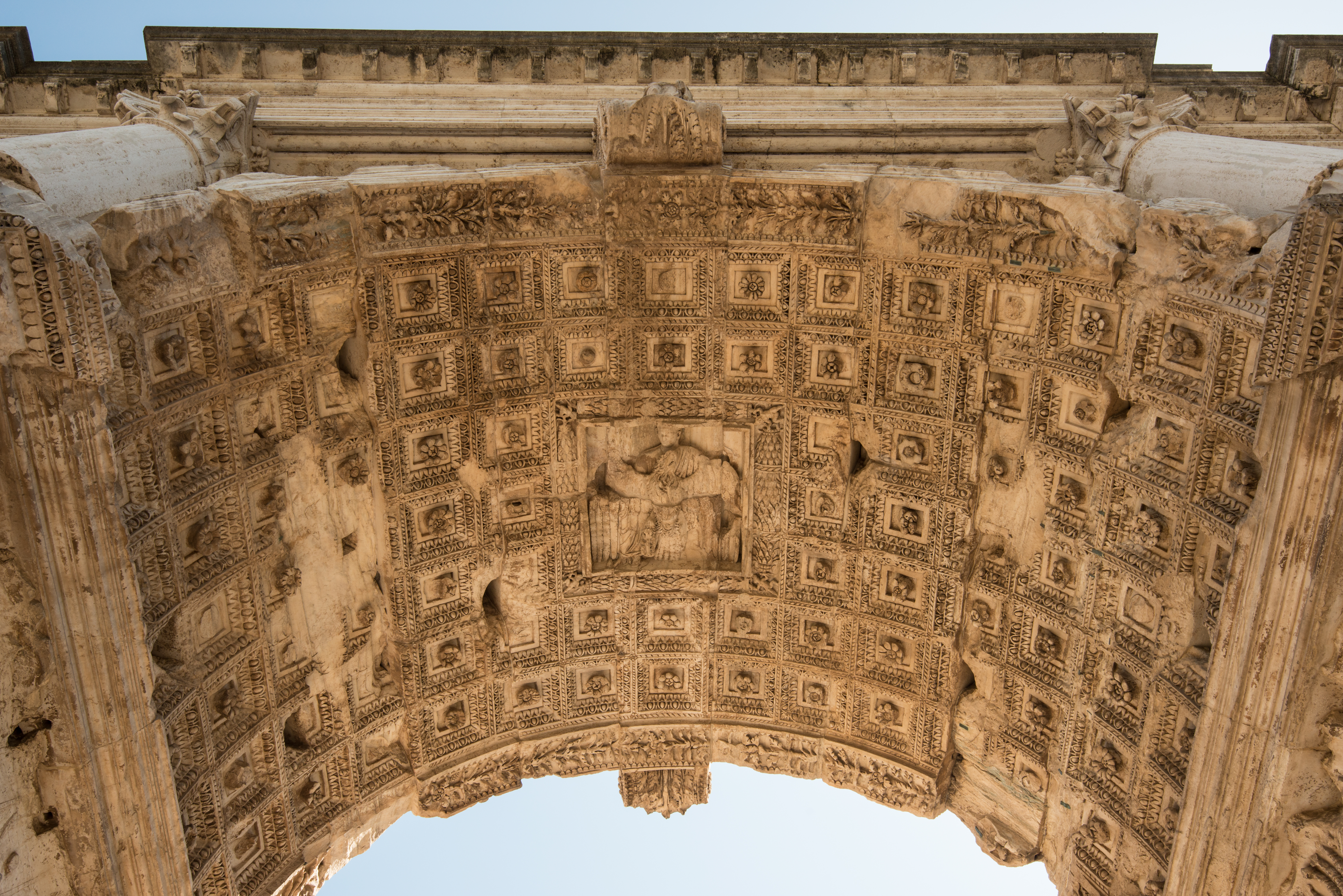
Arch of Titus, Rome (ca. 81 AD)

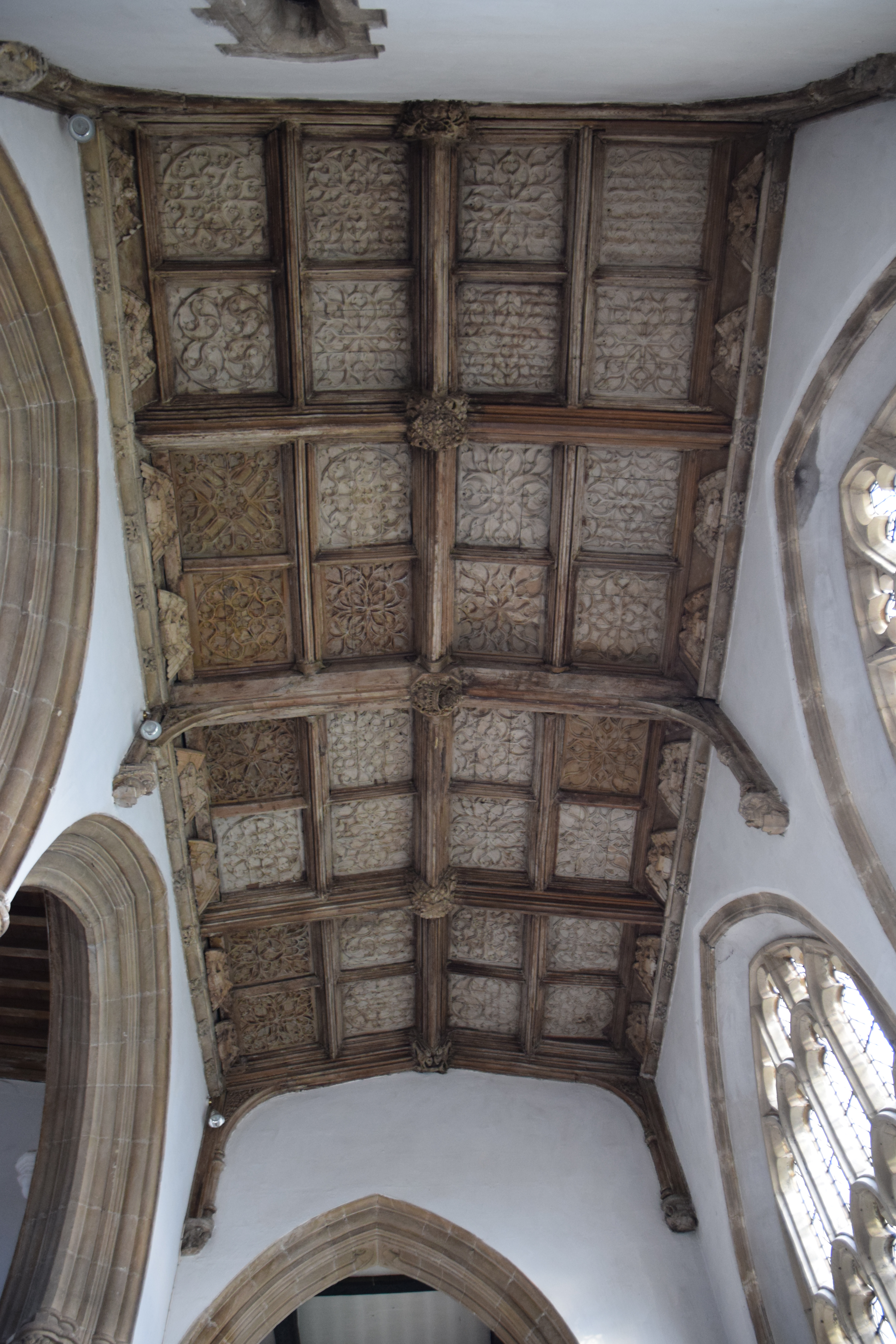
15th-century Perpendicular Gothic coffers in St Cuthbert's Church, Wells, Somerset (1470)

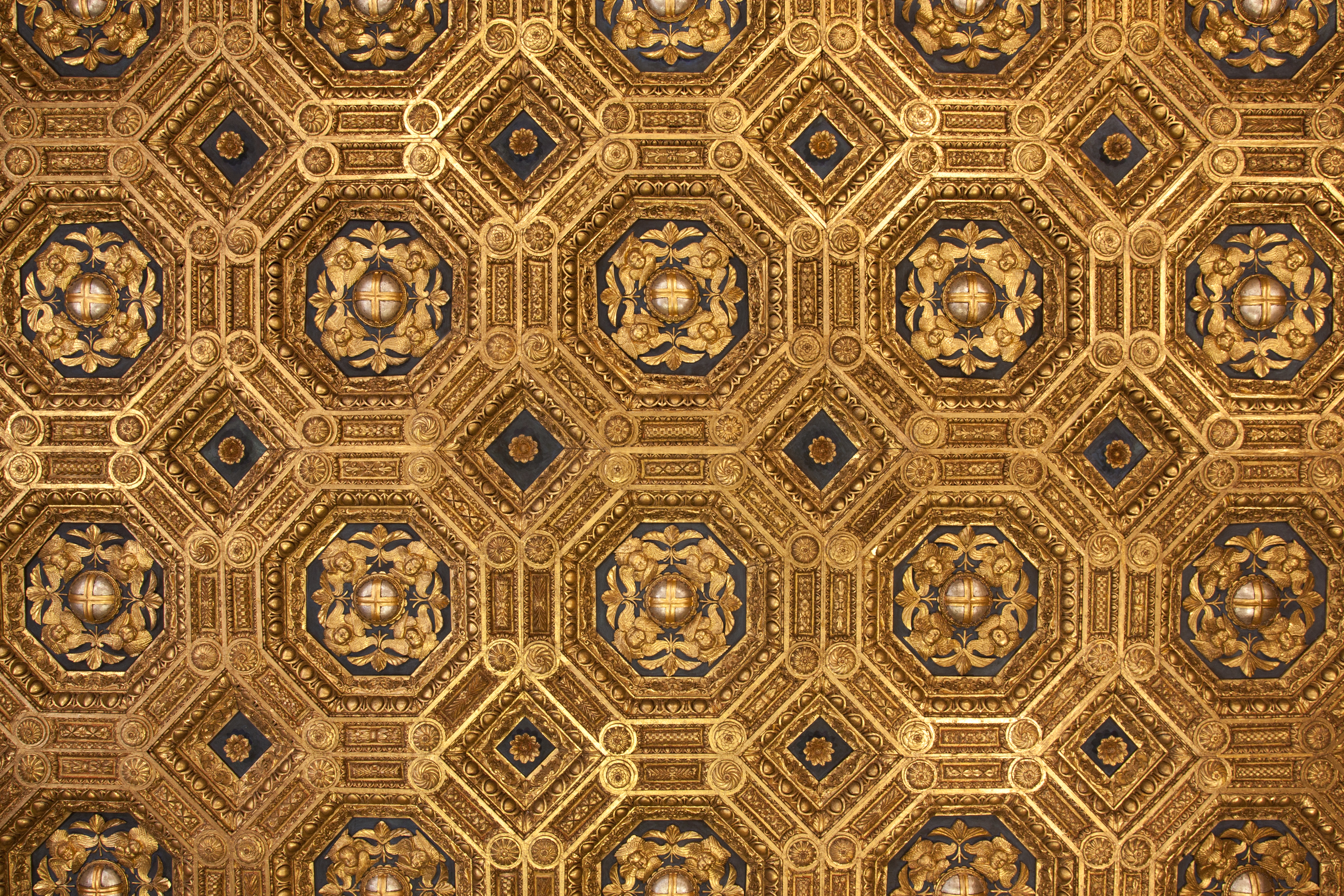
Renaissance ceiling of the Sala dell'Udienza, in the Palazzo Vecchio in Florence by Giuliano da Maiano (1470–76)

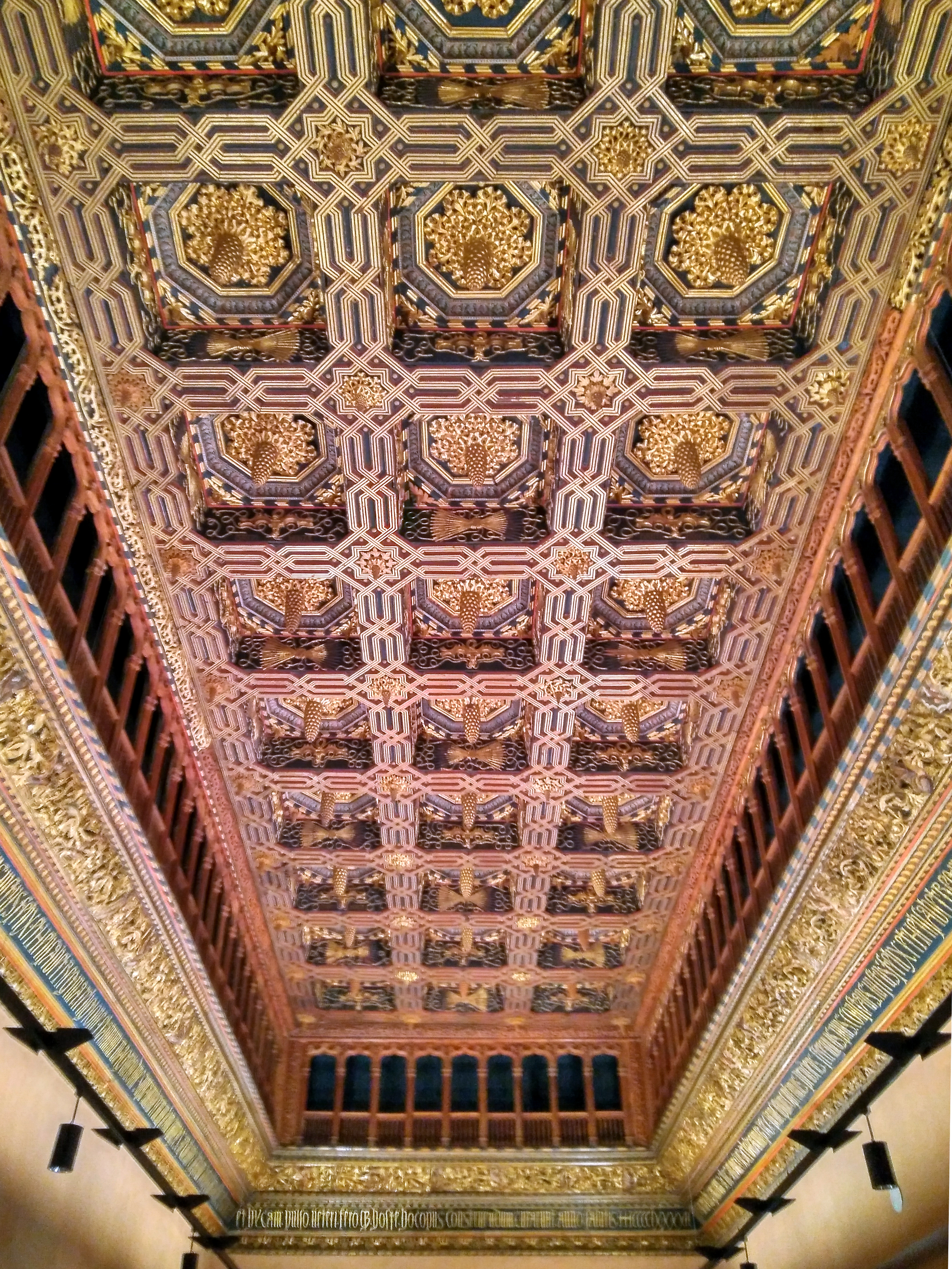
Artesonado ceiling of the Throne Room of Aljafería Palace, Zaragoza (1492)

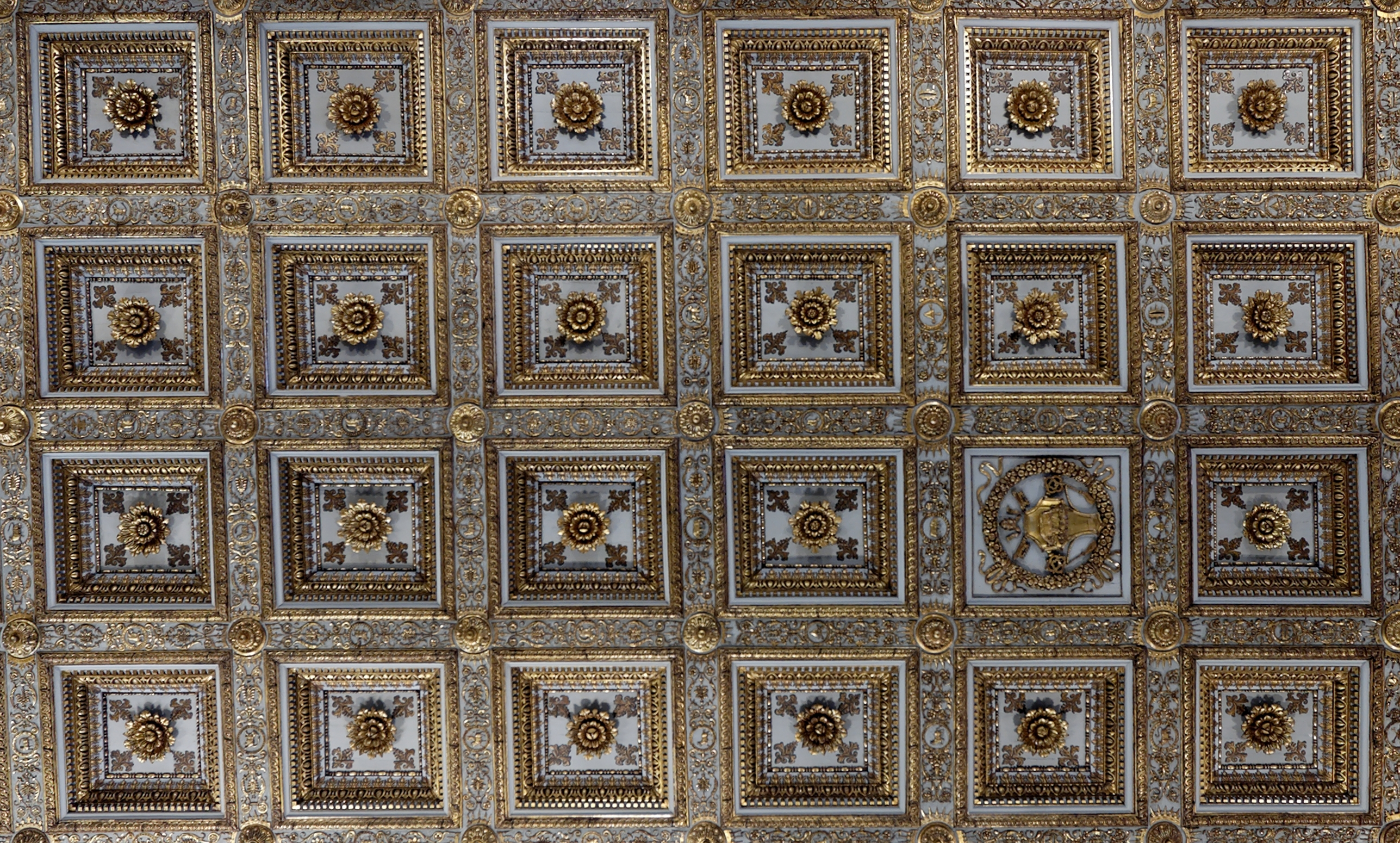
Giuliano da Sangallo's flat caisson ceiling from Basilica di Santa Maria Maggiore, Rome (early 16th ct.)

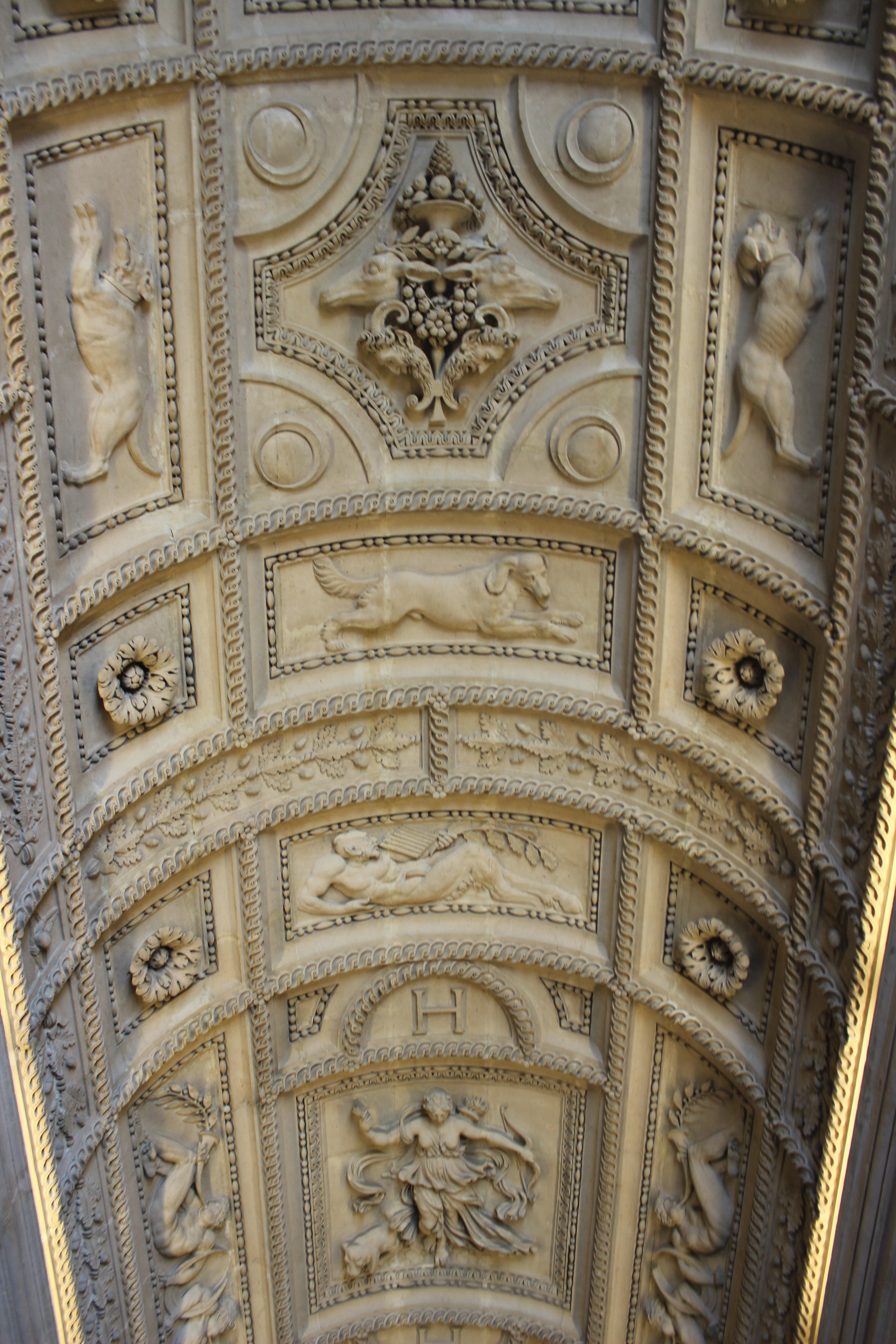
Aile Lescot, Louvre Palace, Paris (1545)

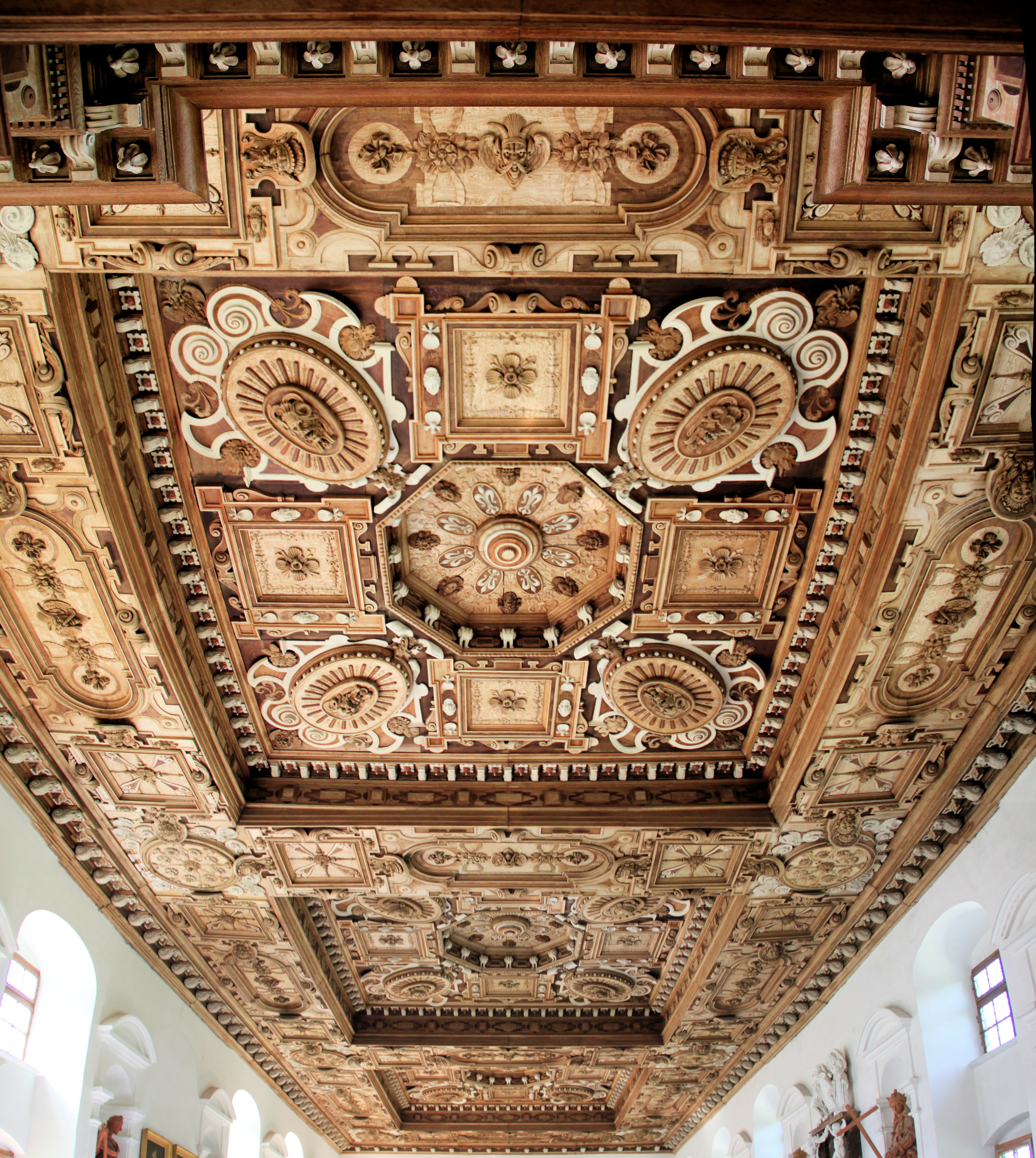
Zedernsaal (Cedar Hall) of Fugger Castle, Kirchheim in Schwaben (1578–85)

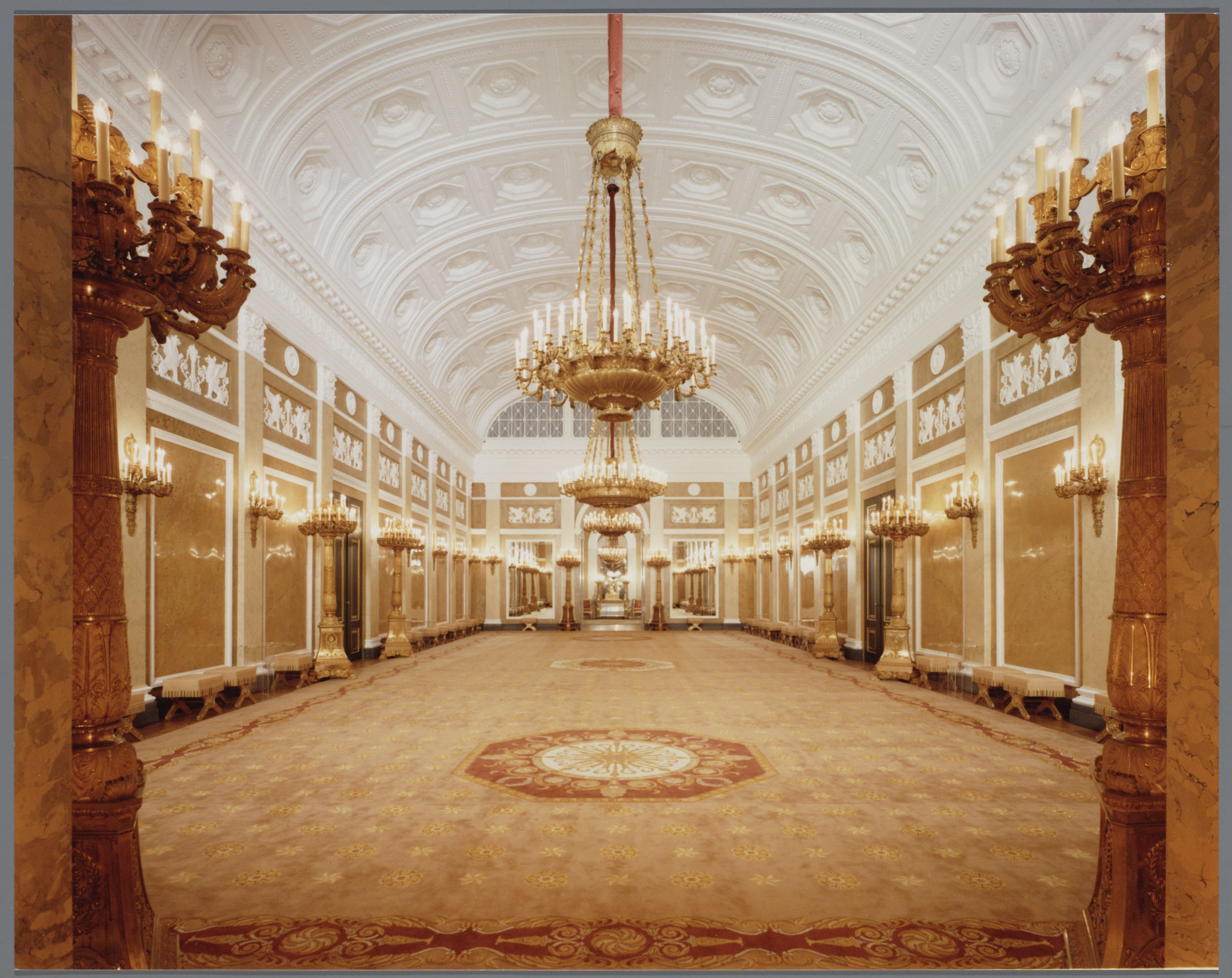
The ballroom (1814) in Noordeinde Palace, the Hague, Netherlands

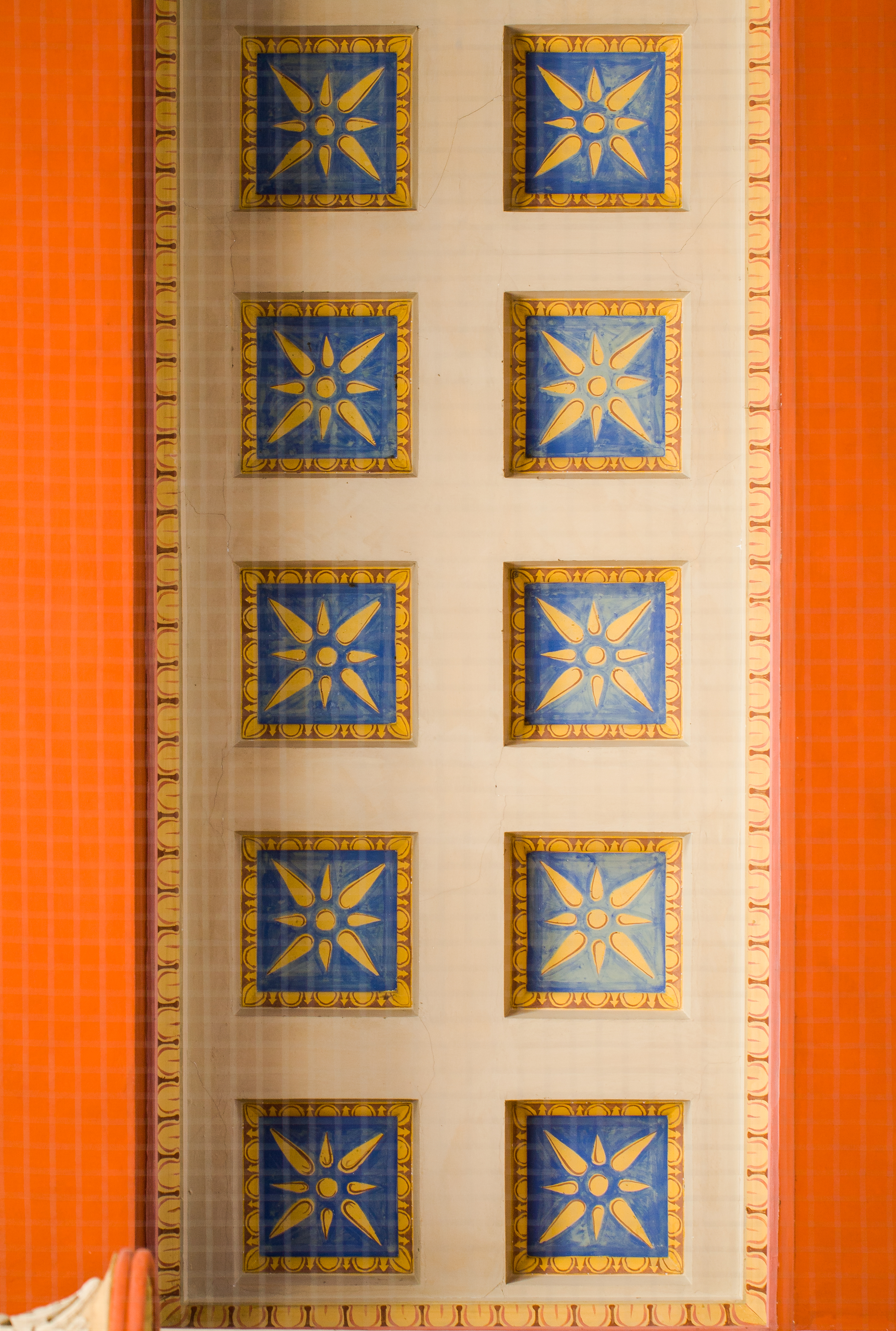
Greek revival ceiling of the Propylaea, Munich, Germany (1862)

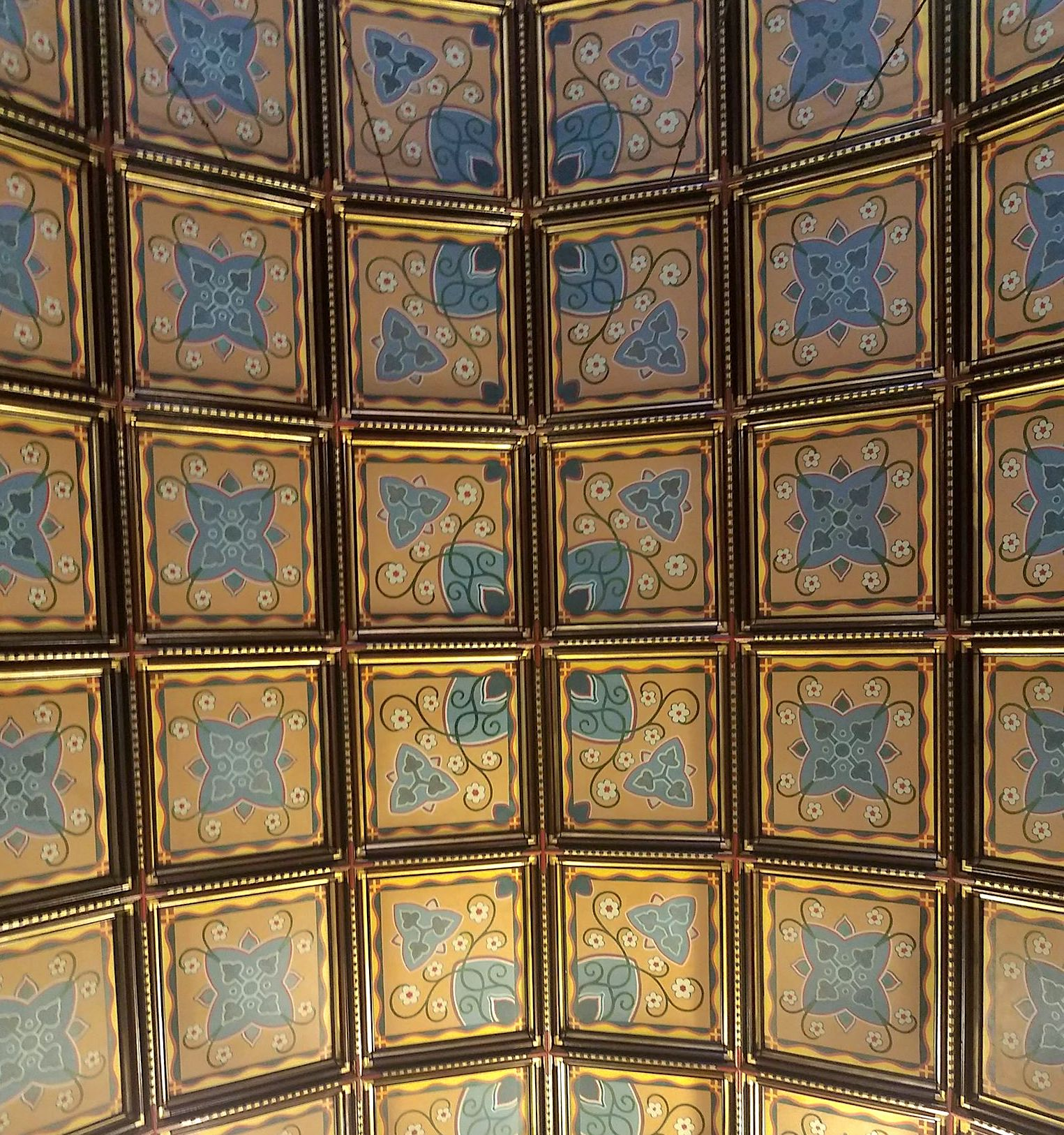
Chancel ceiling, Church of the Good Shepherd, Rosemont, Pennsylvania (1893)

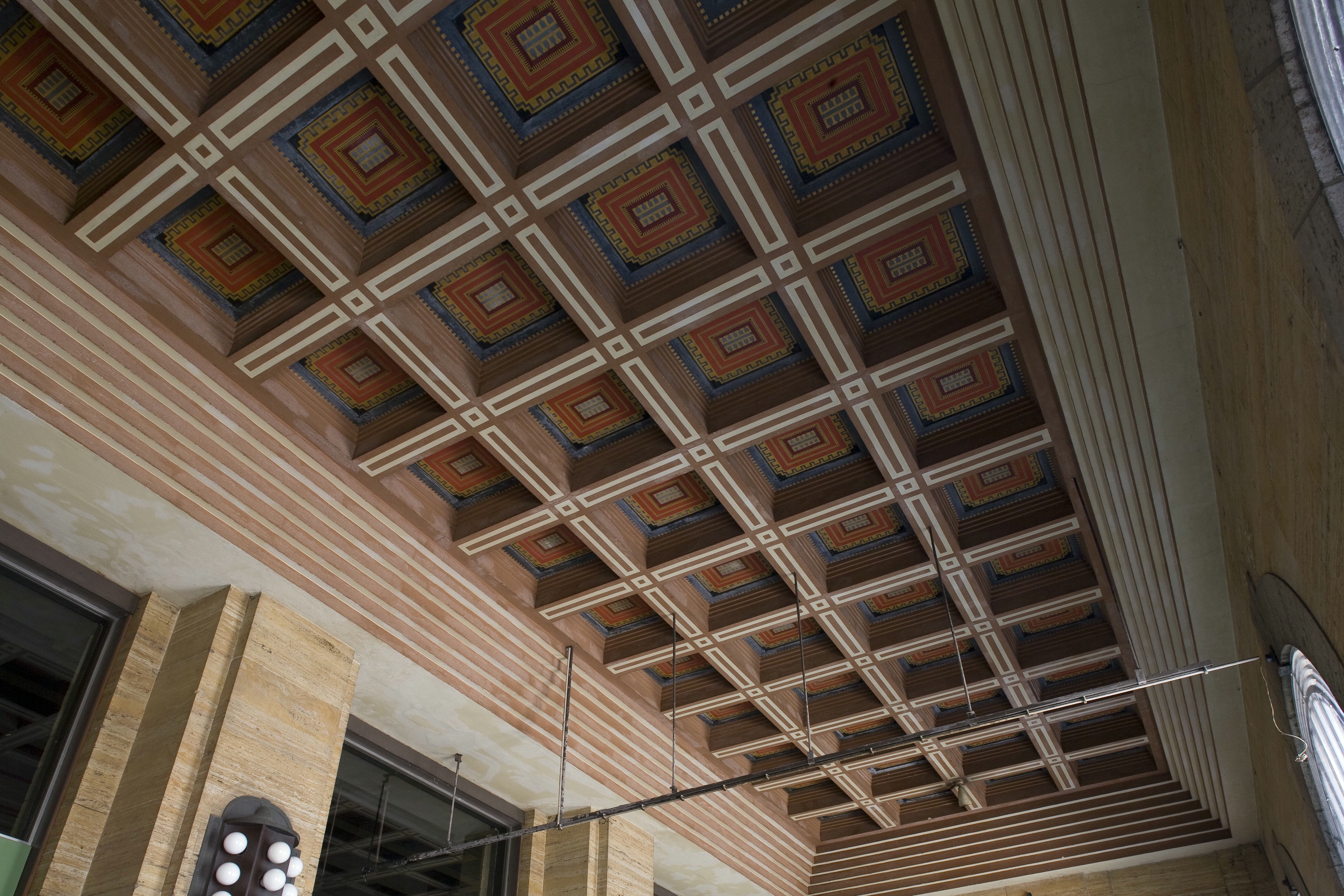
Ceiling of the Main Post Office, Rotterdam (1915–22)

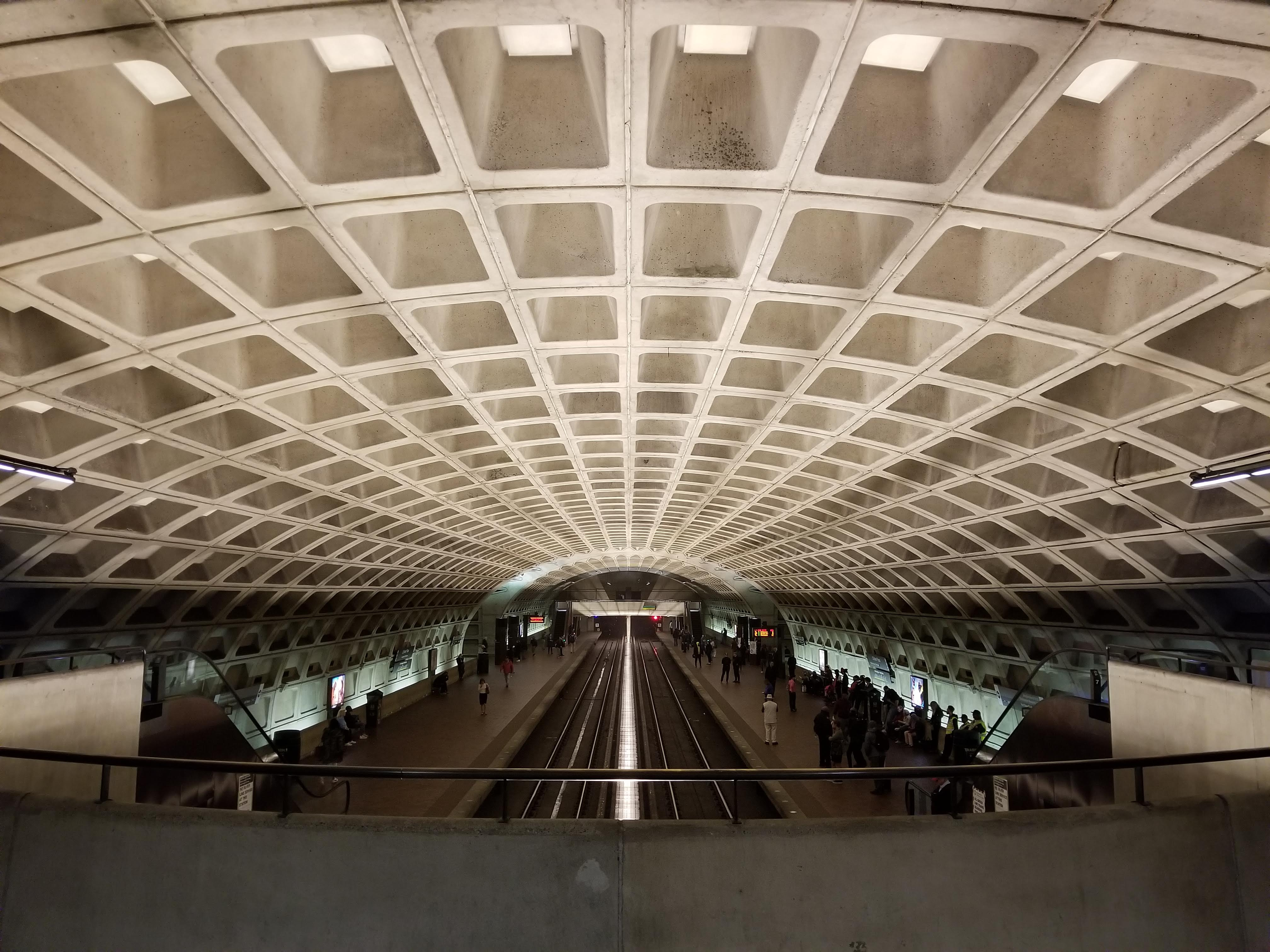
Coffered ceiling typical of stations on the Metro in Washington, DC (1969–76)

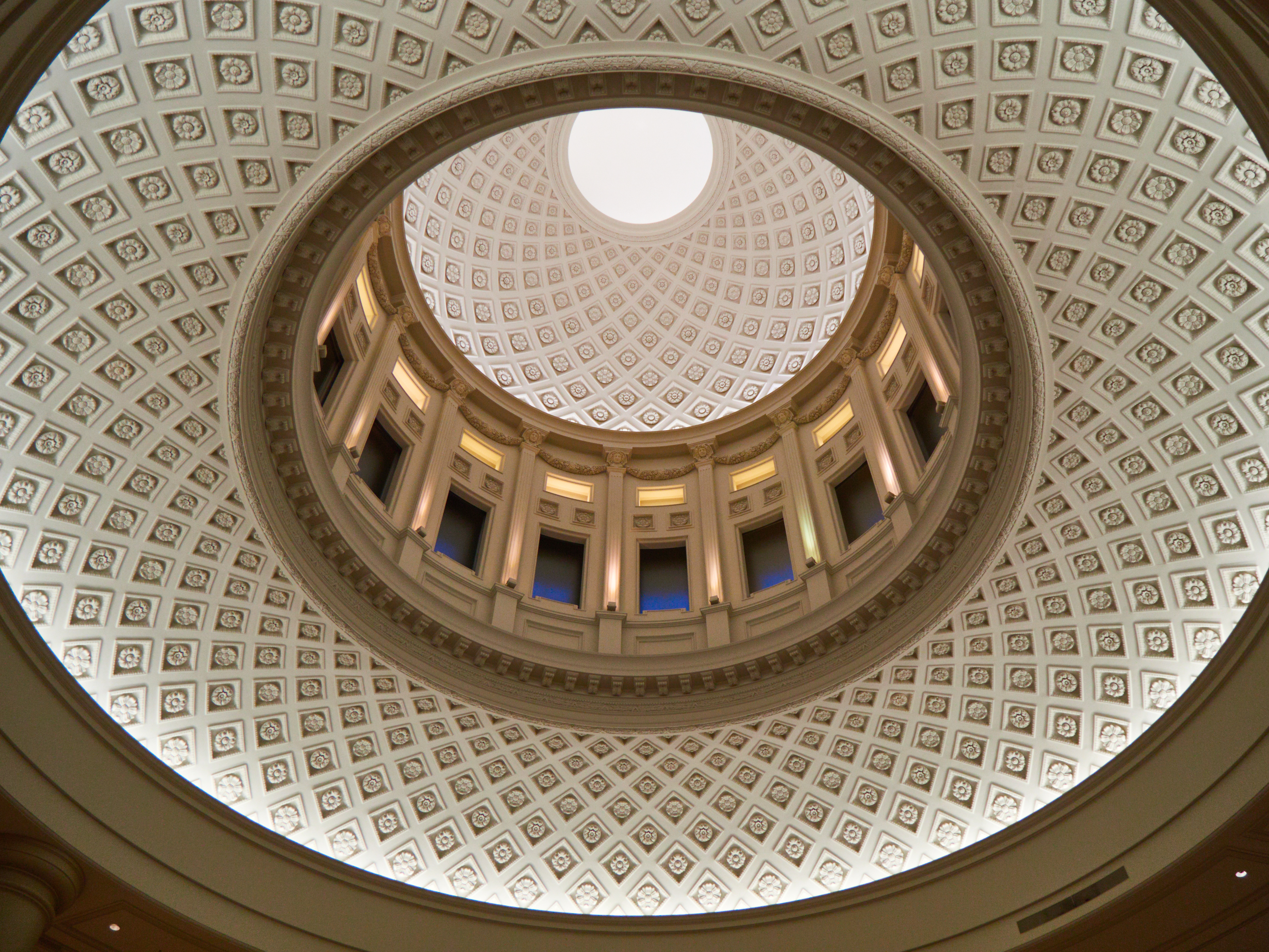
New Classical coffered ceiling of the Chimei Museum rotunda, Tainan (2015)

== See also ==
- Dome
- Dropped ceiling
- Cove ceiling
- Beam ceiling
- Muqarnas
