= San Francesco, Vetralla =

Building in Vetralla, Italy

San Francesco

Religion
- Affiliation: Roman Catholic
- Province: Diocese of Viterbo

Location
- Location: Vetralla, Lazio, Italy
- Interactive map of San Francesco
- Coordinates: 42°19′21.7″N 12°02′54.9″E

Architecture
- Type: Church
- Style: Gothic
- Completed: 13th century

San Francesco is a Roman Catholic parish church, built in a Gothic style with Romanesque architectural elements specially in the crypt, located in the town of Vetralla, province of Viterbo, region of Lazio, Italy.

== History ==
A church at the site, originally dedicated to Mary, likely existed by the 7th century, but it was razed, likely in 1187 by the occupying forces of Viterbo. A new church was begun to be erected soon after. The main altar was consecrated by Pope Clement III (1187-1191). The church was complete and visited by Pope Innocent III in 1207. In the 15th century, the church was assigned to the Franciscan order.

The church, built mainly with tuff stone, has a long nave without a notable transept. The semicircular apse has blind arches with tall pilasters. The flanks of the church has a few small narrow windows. The square bell tower with mullioned windows rises from the side of the apse. Of interest, the portal and interior columns have floridly decorated capitals. The crypt also has columns with decorated capitals.

Among the works inside are a tomb of Briobis by Paolo Gualdo, and a fresco of St Ursula and the Virgins by a follower of Benozzo Gozzoli.
