= Barbarano Romano =

- Comune
- Comune di Barbarano Romano
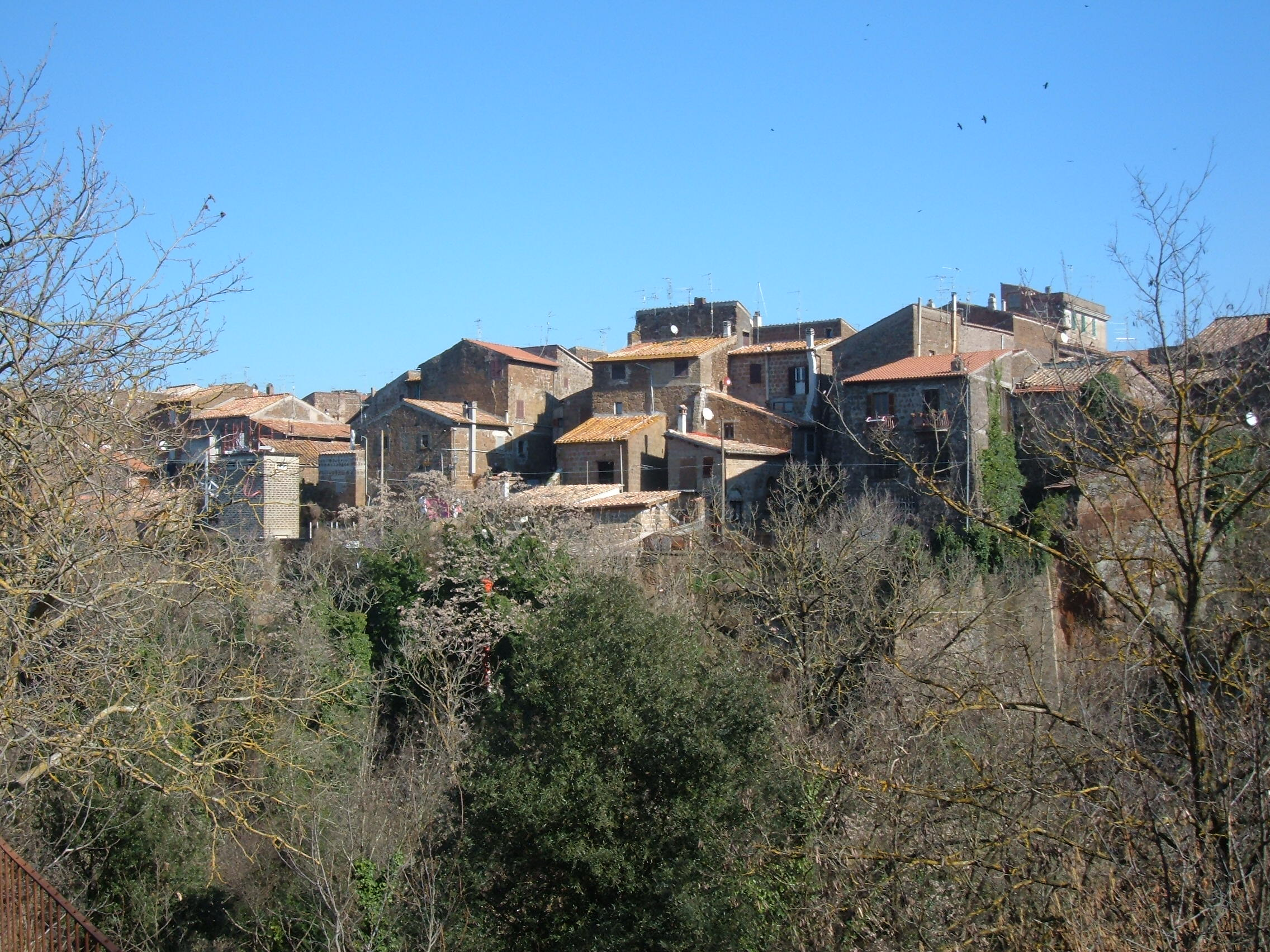

- Coat of arms

- Location within Italy Location within Lazio
- Coordinates: 42°15′N 12°4′E
- Country: Italy
- Region: Lazio
- Province: Viterbo (VT)

Government
  - Mayor: Rinaldo Marchesi

Area
  - Total: 37.56 km^{2} (14.50 sq mi)
- Elevation: 340 m (1,120 ft)

Population (30 April 2017)
  - Total: 1,068
  - Density: 28.43/km^{2} (73.65/sq mi)
- Demonym: Barbaranesi
- Time zone: UTC+1 (CET)
  - Summer (DST): UTC+2 (CEST)
- Postal code: 01010
- Dialing code: 0761
- Patron saint: St. Barbara
- Saint day: 4 December
- Website: Official website

Barbarano Romano is a comune (municipality) in the Province of Viterbo in the Italian region of Latium, located about 50 kilometres (31 mi) northwest of Rome and about 20 kilometres (12 mi) south of Viterbo.

Barbarano Romano borders the following municipalities: Blera, Capranica, Vejano, Vetralla, Villa San Giovanni in Tuscia.

== History ==
The volcanic height on which the town stands was likely the site of an ancient village dating from the Bronze Age, as numerous artifacts found at the base of the hill attest. However, records of a stable settlement only appear in the Middle Ages.

Near the end of the main street, Via Vittorio Emanuele, stood a pentagonal tower, remains of a Lombard fortress known as Desiderio's - after the last Lombard King who around 771 fortified Viterbo and nearby villages to oppose Charlemagne's Franks, until 1930.

An original marble plaque from 1280, located at the entrance of the main Church of S. Maria Assunta, indicates it was built in 1280, during the papal vacancy following the death of Pope Nicholas III. Thus, Barbarano was part of the Lombard Roman Duchy, which, after the donation of Liutprand in 728, became property of the Church in the 8th century.

Owned by the Anguillara in the 14th century, it later passed to the Orsini and finally to the Borgia in the 15th century.

== Archaeology ==
Barbarano Romano is home to the ancient necropolis of San Giuliano, an Etruscan burial site that dated from the seventh century to the third century BC. Among its tombs, the "Queen’s Tomb" stands out as the largest, dating back to the fifth century BC. In March 2024, another large tomb was unearthed within the necropolis grounds.

Discoveries in the site stem from archaeological excavations that began in the 1960s, initiated by Gustaf VI Adolf of Sweden and continued by the Archaeological Superintendence for Southern Etruria. Directed by Prof. Stephan Steingraber of Roma 3 University, the site is home to a museum, whose exhibits span from the Neolithic to the Iron Age, including the Villanovan era, and highlight Etruscan culture with a focus on ceramics, funerary sculptures, and ex-voto reproductions. Among the notable pieces is a sarcophagus known as "the priestess," featuring a detailed depiction of a female figure with a religious instrument, alongside a collection of near-life-sized Etruscan funerary sculptures, including a lion.

== Main sights ==
- Medieval walls
- Church of the Crucifix (Chiesa del Crocifisso), built in the 12th-13th centuries
- Deconsecrated church of Sant'Angelo
- Church of Santa Maria del Piano (13th-late 16th centuries)
- Communal Palace
- Ancient necropolis of San Giuliano
