= City and Territory Museum =

History and archaeology museum in Vetralla, Italy

- Museo della Città e del Territorio
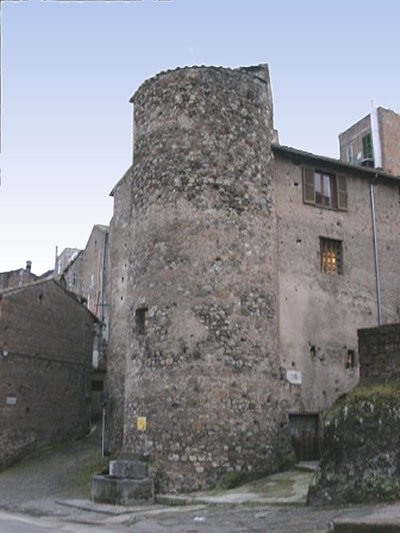
- Established: 1992
- Location: Via di Porta Marchetta 2, Vetralla
- Coordinates: 42.321476°N 12.053351°E
- Type: Ethnographic, History, Folklore, Art
- Director: Emanuela Vigilanti
- Website: http://www.museoterritorio.it/

The City and Territory Museum is a museum in Vetralla, Lazio, central Italy. It was founded in 1992 by Enrico Guidoni and Elisabetta De Minicis. It is located where part of northern walls of Vetralla used to be. It is run by the Tuscia University in Viterbo.

The museum was created as a center for documenting the architectural traditions of small towns, with special attention to Tuscia, and has gradually expanded to include several areas relating to local construction techniques, traditional crafts, folklore.

== Structure and activities ==
The museum presents a careful survey of the quarries, ironworks, furnaces and wood cutting, and their associated tools. The museum has also promoted the recording of the work of living local craftsmen, who are custodians of arts passed down through the centuries.

In 2008, it opened a cellar, an underground museum where it reconstructed a nineteenth-century cellar where all the items related to wine production are shown.

The museum has also launched a catalog of all the categories of cultural goods at increased risk in Tuscia, including private houses, medieval walls, decorative pavements, street trees, street furniture, historic gardens, and more, offering documentation about the real state of the local heritage and suggesting proper restoration and enhancement.

The City and Territory Museum is also houses the associations Vetralla Città d'Arte and Diva Cassia. Both are designed to protect and enhance the artistic, historical, cultural and environmental heritage of Vetralla and its region.
