= Everso II degli Anguillara =

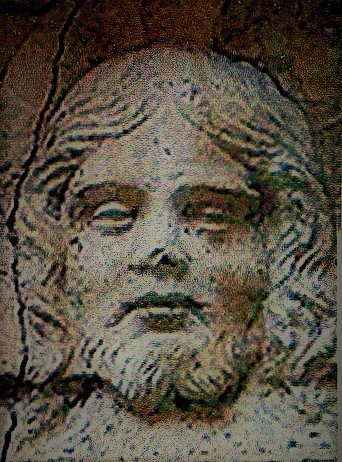

Coat of Arms

Everso II degli Anguillara (died 4 September 1464) was an Italian condottiero, a member of the Anguillara family.

== Papal service ==
He was born in the late 14th century, the son of Dolce I and Battista Orsini, and in the early 15th century inherited large possessions in the northern Latium. In 1431 he entered the service of Pope Eugene IV, warring against the Colonna. He was a fierce enemy of the Prefetti di Vico.

== Campaigns ==
In 1433 he fought against the troops of Niccolò Piccinino and, the next year, against Francesco I Sforza. Later, with the help of Giovanni Vitelleschi, he managed to destroy forever the power of the Prefetti di Vico in northern Latium. After a failed attempt to free Vitelleschi, who was prisoner at Castel Sant'Angelo (1440), he was hired by Cardinal Ludovico Scarampi, for whom Everso fought Piccinino and Alfonso V of Aragon. During the struggle between the Papal States and Sforza, he sided with the former.

In 1448 he besieged Piombino, helping Rinaldo Orsini, who was attacked by the Aragonese. The latter, anyway, hired him four years later to fight the Papal troops in the Marche, Everso being excommunicated by Pope Nicholas V.

== Conflict with Pius II ==
Later, during the reign of Calixtus III, he was in conflict with Napoleone Orsini, the two being pacified by the new pope Pius II. However, when the pope contested with him the possession of Vico, he sided with Piccinino and conquered Assisi, Nocera Umbra and Viterbo. He also planned to capture Rome itself during Pius' sojourn in Siena. In 1461 Everso planned to kill the Pope, but in vain.

== Death ==
He died in his lands in 1464.

== Bibliography ==
- AA. VV., Anguillara Sabazia and surroundings. Walking through history and nature, Municipality of Anguillara Sabazia 2008.
- Teodoro Amayden, History of Roman families, Forni, Bologna 1979.
- Feliciano Bussi, Istoria of the city of Viterbo, Bernabò, Rome-Viterbo 1742.
- Ignazio Ciampi, Chronicles and Statutes of the City of Viterbo, Forni, Bologna 1872.
- Edoardo Fumagalli, Sforza documents on Everso dell'Anguillara and his sons, in: Vita e Pensiero, year 60, fasc. 2, Catholic University of the Sacred Heart, Rome 1986.
- Umberto Gnoli, La famille et le Palais des Anguillara in Rome, Impr. Social Cooperatives, Paris 1901.
- Maria Antonietta Lozzi Bonaventura, Abbeys, woods and castles, vol. 1, Iter, Subiaco 1990.
- Carlo Camillo Massimo, La torre degli Anguillara, Rome 1847.
- Luigi Ranghiasci, historical Memories of the city of Nepi and its surroundings, Todi 1845.
- Vittorina Sora, The Counts of Anguillara from their origin to 1465, in: Archive of the Roman Society of Homeland History XXX, Rome 1906.
