= Caprarola =

- Comune
- Comune di Caprarola
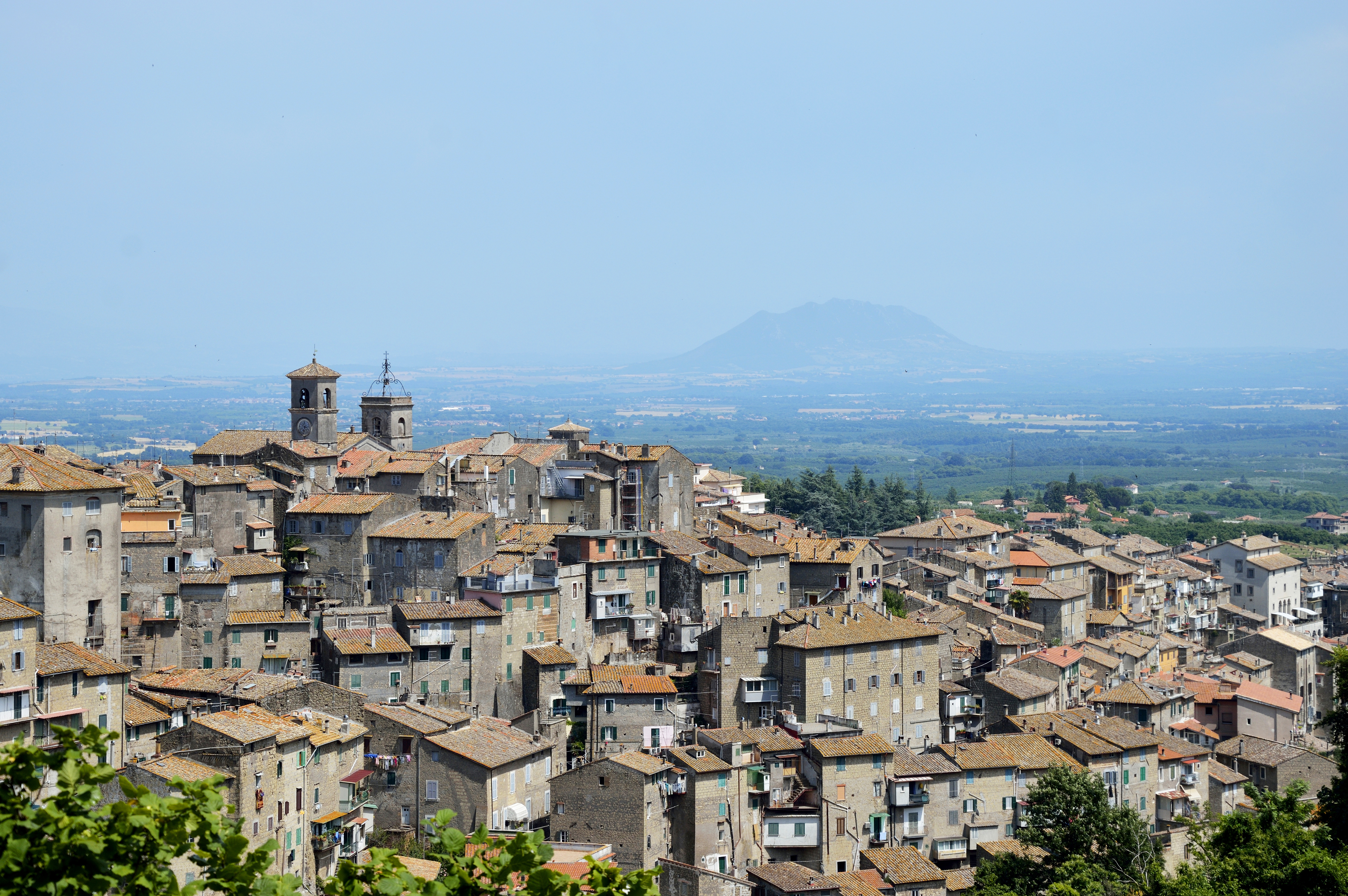
- View of Caprarola

- Location within Italy Location within Lazio
- Coordinates: 42°19′40.3″N 12°14′17.1″E
- Country: Italy
- Region: Lazio
- Province: Viterbo (VT)

Government
  - Mayor: Angelo Borgna

Area
  - Total: 57.58 km^{2} (22.23 sq mi)
- Elevation: 520 m (1,710 ft)

Population (31 May 2017)
  - Total: 5,417
  - Density: 94.08/km^{2} (243.7/sq mi)
- Demonym: Caprolatti
- Time zone: UTC+1 (CET)
  - Summer (DST): UTC+2 (CEST)
- Postal code: 01032
- Dialing code: 0761
- Patron saint: St. Egidius
- Saint day: December 26
- Website: Official website

Caprarola is a town and comune in the province of Viterbo, in the Lazio region of central Italy. The village is situated in a range of volcanic hills known as the Cimini Mounts.

The town is home to the large Renaissance mansion or villa which dominates the surrounding country-side, Villa Farnese (or Villa Caprarola). Not to be confused with the Palazzo Farnese in Rome, it was initially built as a fortress, as the town and the surrounding area was a feud of the House of Farnese, by the cardinal Alessandro Farnese senio in 1530, according to a project of the architect Antonio da Sangallo the Younger. After only four years the project came to a halt when the cardinal was elected pope in 1534 under the name Paul III.

== Filmography ==
Villa Farnese was used as film location in many movies and TV series, such as Medici: Masters of Florence, The Man From Uncle and The Two Popes.
