= Ronciglione =

Ronciglione Ronció
- Comune
- Comune di Ronciglione
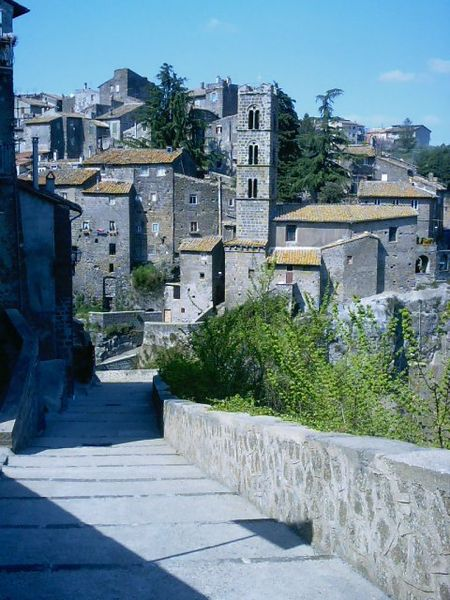
- A view of the medieval burg of Ronciglione

- Coat of arms

- Location within Italy Location within Lazio
- Coordinates: 42°17′N 12°12′E
- Country: Italy
- Region: Lazio
- Province: Viterbo (VT)
- Frazioni: Lago di Vico

Government
  - Mayor: Mario Mengoni

Area
  - Total: 52.28 km^{2} (20.19 sq mi)
- Elevation: 441 m (1,447 ft)

Population (31 December 2014)
  - Total: 8,715
  - Density: 166.7/km^{2} (431.7/sq mi)
- Demonym: Ronciglionesi
- Time zone: UTC+1 (CET)
  - Summer (DST): UTC+2 (CEST)
- Postal code: 01037
- Dialing code: 0761
- Patron saint: St. Bartholomew
- Saint day: August 24
- Website: Official website

Ronciglione (Italian pronunciation: [rontʃiʎˈʎoːne]; locally Ronció) is a comune in the province of Viterbo, in the Italian region of Latium, about 20 kilometres (12 mi) from Viterbo. The city is located in the Cimini mountains, over two tuff scarps, on the southeastern slope of the former volcano crater now housing Lake Vico.

It is one of I Borghi più belli d'Italia ("The most beautiful villages of Italy"). The city's economy is based largely on agriculture, with production of nuts, chestnuts and wine.

== History ==
The most ancient document mentioning Ronciglione dates to 1103. A historian from the 16th century Orvieto set its foundation around 1045, due to the Prefetti of Vico. Later it was a possession of the Anguillara, a Guelph family of Rome. Pope Paul II conquered it to the Papal States in 1465.

In 1526 Ronciglione became a possession of the Farnese, and lived its period of greatest splendour: its industries included manufacturing of copper, iron, paper, weapons and others. Ended in 1649 the Farnese seignory and bought back by Pope Innocent X, in 1728 it received the status of city by Pope Benedict XIII.

The Ronciglionesi took active part in the Roman Republic of 1798–99: the French troops, however, crushed the revolt and burnt the city on July 20, 1799.

== Main sights ==
The town's sights include:

- The Castle, originally built in the High Middle Ages, with the characteristic angle rounded towers.
- The Cathedral, a Baroque edifice designed by Pietro da Cortona, rebuilt by Carlo Rainaldi between 1671 and 1695. The bell tower is from 1734. It houses a Tryptych of Christ by the Viterbese painter Gabriele di Francesco (15th century).
- The church of Santa Maria della Provvidenza (11th century), restored in Baroque style, although still retaining a three-floors Romanesque belfry. The interior, with a single nave, houses some frescoes from the 15th century.
- The ruins of the church of St. Andrew (12th-13th centuries), with a belfry from 1436.
- Church of Santa Maria della Pace, began in 1581 and variously attributed to Jacopo Barozzi da Vignola or Rainaldi. It houses paintings by Sebastiano Conca, Cavalier D'Arpino and a tabernacle by Sansovino.
- The suggestive basilica church of Sant'Eusebio, along the Via Cassia, 3 km in direction of Rome. Located on a wide alture, it was built by monks escaped from Palestine in the 7th and 8th centuries. Traces of the ancient coenoby and the belfry can still be seen. The interior of the current edifice has a nave with aisles of irregular dimensions, with 12th-13th centuries frescoes and a Madonna with Child from the 15th century. It is dedicated to St. Eusebius, bishop of Sutri which is nearby.
- Villa Lina. A villa with extensive botanical gardens, built by Ulisse Igliori for his wife Lina in 1928 and currently owned and operated as a luxury bed and breakfast.

== Culture ==
Ronciglione is known for its Carnival. Established as a derivative of the Renaissance Carnival of Rome, it has typical "empty races" in which the horses are left to run without riders. The cities are divided into 9 contrades which contend for the "Palio of the Manna". The garden scenes of the 2007 film Silk featuring Keira Knightley were filmed on the grounds of Villa Lina.

== Transportation ==
Ronciglione is served by the SP1 Cimina provincial road, connecting it to SS2 Cassia national road which starts from Rome, and to Viterbo. SP35 provincial road connects the town to Caprarola and Capranica.

There is a station on the Orte-Civitavecchia railroad, which has been abandoned in 1995.
