= Vetralla =

- Comune
- Comune di Vetralla
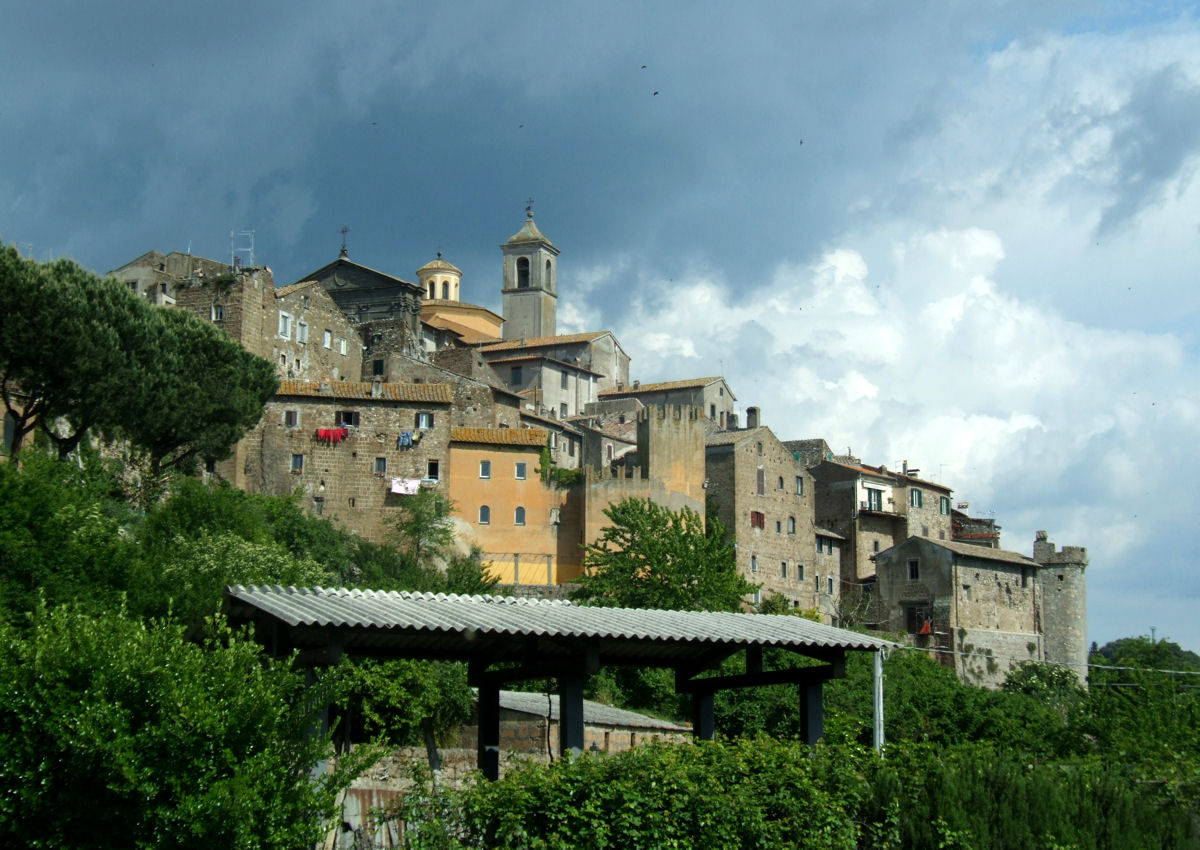

- Coat of arms

- Location within Italy Location within Lazio
- Coordinates: 42°19′14.8″N 12°03′12.8″E
- Country: Italy
- Region: Lazio
- Province: Viterbo (VT)
- Frazioni: Cinelli, Cura di Vetralla, Giardino, La Botte, Le Valli, Madonna del Ponte, Mazzacotto, Mazzocchio, Pietrara, Tre Croci

Government
  - Mayor: Franco Coppari

Area
  - Total: 113.01 km^{2} (43.63 sq mi)
- Elevation: 300 m (980 ft)

Population (31 December 2010)
  - Total: 13,508
  - Density: 119.53/km^{2} (309.58/sq mi)
- Demonym: Vetrallesi
- Time zone: UTC+1 (CET)
  - Summer (DST): UTC+2 (CEST)
- Postal code: 01019
- Dialing code: 0761
- Patron saint: St. Hyppolite
- Saint day: August 14
- Website: Official website

Vetralla is a town and comune in the province of Viterbo, in central Italy, 11 kilometres (7 mi) south of that city, located on a shoulder of Monte Fogliano.

== History ==
The castle of Vetralla in a fresco in the Palazzo dei Priori, Vetralla

Vetralla's dominating fortified position in the heart of Etruscan territories has been continuously occupied since the Early Middle Ages. The Roman site, two kilometers distant, was a posting station on the Via Cassia; some ruins of walls and paving at S. Maria di Forcassi still mark the Roman Forum Cassii. The site was depopulated in the later Empire, when a smaller population retreated to the present strategic position commanding the valley, where it remained exposed to attack, in spite of the imposing walls that encircled it.

The little fortress had been incorporated into the Papal States from their historic beginnings with the Lombard king Liutprand's Donation of Sutri (728) to Pope Gregory II, but the lords of Viterbo held it from 1110 to 1134. By 1145, Pope Eugene III was installed at Vetralla, safely removed from the violence and party strife of Rome; from here he issued his bull Quantum praedecessores, calling for the Second Crusade.

The territory was given extensive woodlands by Pope Innocent III in 1206, which brought it into fierce contention with the lords of Viterbo who coveted the land. To this day, in the annual ceremonial Sposalizio dell'albero ("marriage of the tree"), the mayor of Vetralla reaffirms the town's rights of possession on Monte Fogliano. The fief was entrusted through the centuries to various noble families associated with the Papacy, as lords of Vetralla: first the Orsini, then the Di Vico until 1435, when the last lord Giacomo di Vico was forcibly ousted by the cardinal-condottiere Giovanni Vitelleschi, confined in the fortress of Soriano, then beheaded. Vetralla then passed in rapid succession among a series of Papal nobles: to Cardinal Giovanni Borgia, to Lorenzo Cybo (1529), and to Cardinal Alessandro Farnese in 1534.

Uniquely among non-English cities, in 1512 Vetralla received the protection of the English Crown, bestowed upon the town by Henry VIII, and a monument commemorating this event can still be found in the local town hall.

== Main sights ==
- Church of San Pietro
- Church of San Francesco
- Church of Sant'Angelo
- Grotta Porcina
- Church of Santa Maria in Forocasii
- City and Territory Museum
- Rock necropolis of Norchia

== Transportation ==
Vetralle is reached by the SS Cassia national road. The Aurelia bis road connects it to Tarquinia.

It has a station on the FR3 Rome-Capranica-Viterbo regional railroad.

== See also ==
- Monti Cimini
