= Monti Cimini =

Mountain range in Italy

Coordinates: 42°21′30″N 12°10′40″E

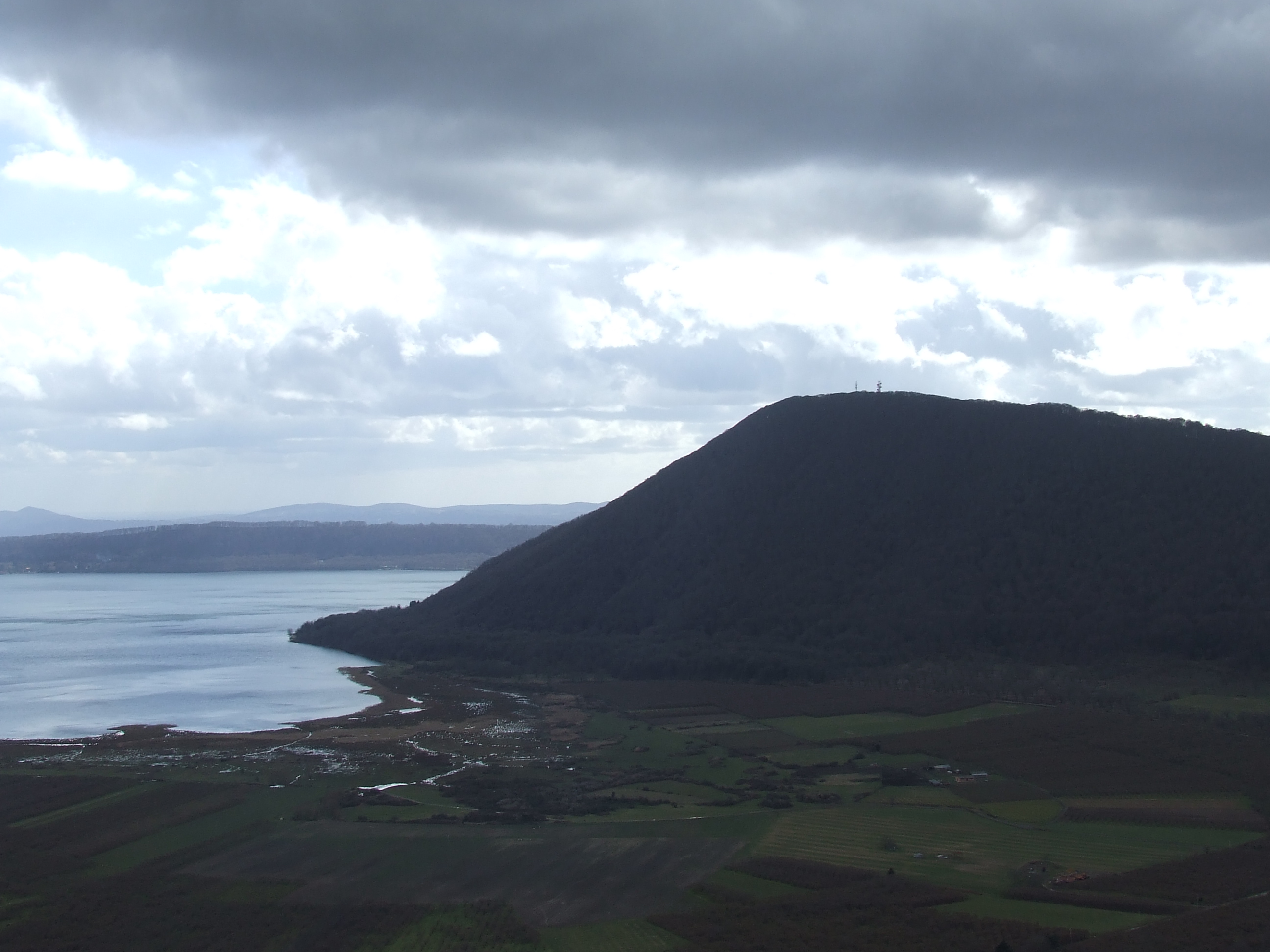
- The Mount Fogliano and Lake Vico.

Geography
- Location within Italy
- Parent range: Antiapennine

Geology
- Rock age: 1.35-0.94 myr
- Mountain type(s): Stratovolcano; Caldera; Lava dome
- Last eruption: Pleistocene

The Monti Cimini, in English: Cimini Hills, are a range of densely wooded volcanic hills approximately 56 km (35 mi) north-west of Rome. They are part of the Antiapennine range, facing the Apennines main range towards the Tyrrhenian Sea. They are situated in the centre of Tuscia Viterbese, the highest point at Mount Cimino, 1,053 m (3,455 ft) above sea level. Lake Vico, a volcanic crater lake, is situated in the hills.

== Background ==
The vegetation is predominantly beech forestation. The area is renowned for its hot springs, renaissance villas and Etruscan ruins.

== See also ==
- Lake Vico
