= Antonio Blado =

Italian printer (1490-1567)

Antonio Blado (1490-1567) was an Italian printer based in Rome. He was appointed official printer of the Vatican by the future pope Marcellus II. He is noted as the printer who first published Machiavelli's The Prince (1532) and Exercitia spiritualia of St. Ignatius of Loyola (1548) as well as over 1200 surviving works.

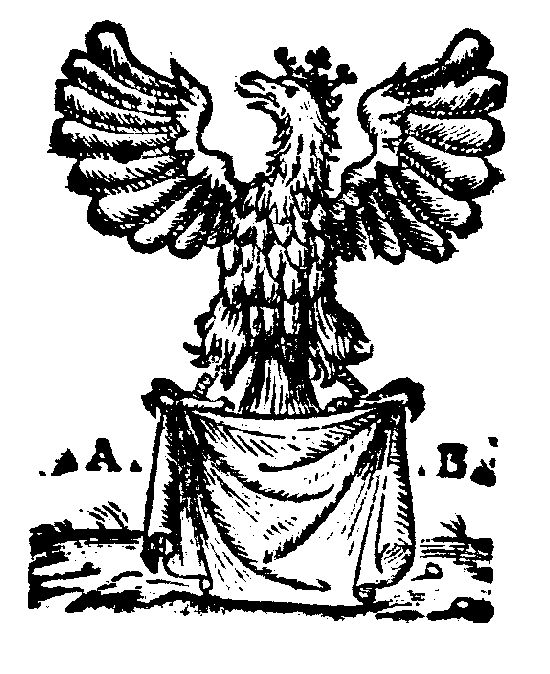
Fig 1. Antonio Blado's Printers Mark

== Early Life ==
Born in Asola (1490), Blado was a native of the same town as Andrea Torresano (b. 1451) and like him he often referred to himself as Di Asola.

By the 16th century, Venice’s printing industry was the largest in Europe. In Venice, the Aldine Press (an enterprise set up by Andrea Torresano and his son-in-law Aldus Manutius) was producing innovative Greek and Latin texts for a burgeoning commercial market. In comparison, Rome served the Vatican and its bureaucracy, the civic government, the university, and the tourists and pilgrims who visited the city.

European printing with moveable type began in Mainz, Germany, in the mid-15th century and spread to Italy, where it came first to Rome via German printers migrating because of wars and bankruptcy at home. These were replaced by printers from Venice and Lombardy, and Blado was one who made the journey and set up business in Rome.

== Establishment in Rome ==
In 1516 he produced his first volume which was an edition of Mirabilia Urbis Romae, a popular guidebook for pilgrims visiting the city. His workshop and sales office was in the area of Campo de Fiori, on the Via Mercatoria, and probably the same premises as formerly used by Arnold Pannartz and Konrad Sweynheim who had brought the mechanical movable-type printing press, to Italy in 1464. The workshop remained there until at least 1572, when a document shows that the business run by his heirs was still there.

Since the beginning of the 16th century a few printers such as Marcello Silber and Francesco Calvo had been working for the papacy.

Fig 2. Papal constitution of Pope Sixtus V printed by the heirs of Antonio Blado in 1586

In 1535 Blado was appointed tipografo camarele, the official printer of the Apostolic Camera, an office in the Roman Curia which assessed and processed taxes, levies and other payments for the papal treasury.

This was the first example of a printing privilege for the official acts of an institution.

He was paid 4 gold ducats per month for this position, which he held until his death. This position was passed down to his heirs, and many papal documents were subsequently printed with the colophon Heredi di Antonio Blado Stampatori Camerali ("by the heirs of Antonio Blado, printers of the Chamber”), see Figure 2.

As printer for the Camera, he produced more than 1500 documents such as bulls, briefs, constitutions, judicial regulations, mandates, privileges, proclamations and other official texts.

The priest Giovanni Gaddi (1493-1542) obtained a ten-year printing privilege for the works of Niccolo Machiavelli, and Blado printed The Prince (see Figure 3), Discourses and Histories, although there was a dispute with another printer, the Florentine Giunti family, who had received a similar privilege from Pope Clement VII. Both sets of books were printed at about the same time.

== Work at the Accademia della Virtu ==
Fig 3. Title page for The Prince printed by Blado in 1532

In Rome Blado worked for the Accademia della Virtù as well as producing works on his own

In 1539, Cardinal Marcello Cervini (futur ePope Marcellus II) commissioned Blado to print the Greek manuscripts of the Vatican Library. Under the patronage of Pope Paul III, Blado recruited Greek scholars Nicolò Majorano and Onorio da Maglie . The manuscripts required Greek characters so on the advice of his patron he went to Venice to consult Paolo Manuzio, who had used Greek characters in his printing of Etymologicon. By 1542 Blado and Majorano produced the first edition of a new commentary on the Iliad by Eustathius.

One of Cervini's objectives in disseminating these works was to provide members of Catholic religious orders with new ways to challenge Reformed scholarship.

In the Greek project he collaborated with the Nicolini de Sabbio brothers, Venetian printers who already had a large Greek printing operation in Venice.

== Censorial Publications ==
In the 16th century, both churches and governments in most European countries attempted to regulate and control printing because it allowed for the rapid and widespread circulation of ideas and information. By 1543, Rome's bookshops were being investigated for banned Protestant publications.

In his role as tipografo camarele, he published in 1557 the first Index of Prohibited Books (Index librorum prohibitorum) on the orders of the Curia. The first edition was suppressed before publication; the second, (1558) is also extremely rare. Blado had already printed an Index of the books censured by the theological faculty of Paris (1549), only one copy is known, now in the Vatican Library.

== Cartographic Work ==
Fig 4. Section of 1551 map of Rome by Leonardo Bufalini (1551) printed by Antonio Blado

Blado also produced several maps and guides for pilgrims. His first work was Bartolomeo Marliani's Topographia (1548) which featured a new woodcut map of ancient Rome, designed to appeal to visitors and Pilgrims. Leonardo Bufalini also produced a new map of Rome which used more modern cartographic techniques such as a scale view, rather than a fanciful birds-eye view. Blado printed this as well, and Blado kept the woodblocks.

== Music Printing ==
The Dorico family pioneered the use of a single impression printing process first developed in England and France. Dorico printed first editions of sacred music by Giovanni Pierluigi da Palestrina and Giovanni Animuccia. Blado was the second printer to use this technique, which reduced the cost and complexity of music printing by printing the staves, the notes and the text all at once.

He printed madrigal books by Costanzo Festa, Giovanni Animuccia and Orlando di Lasso.

== Type ==
Roman scribal technique used by the Camera was known as Chancery hand, and this was the model for the italic typeface developed by Aldus Manutius. Ludovico Vicentino degli Arrighi designed his own italic typefaces which were lost during the sack of Rome (1527), during which he was probably killed. Blado may have acquired them or copied them, and typographical historians have identified similarities with Arrighi's typeface, through either re-use or emulation. The resulting type became one of the most distinctive in Roman printing in the 1530s.

This was emulated in the twentieth century typeface called "Blado".

== Later Career ==
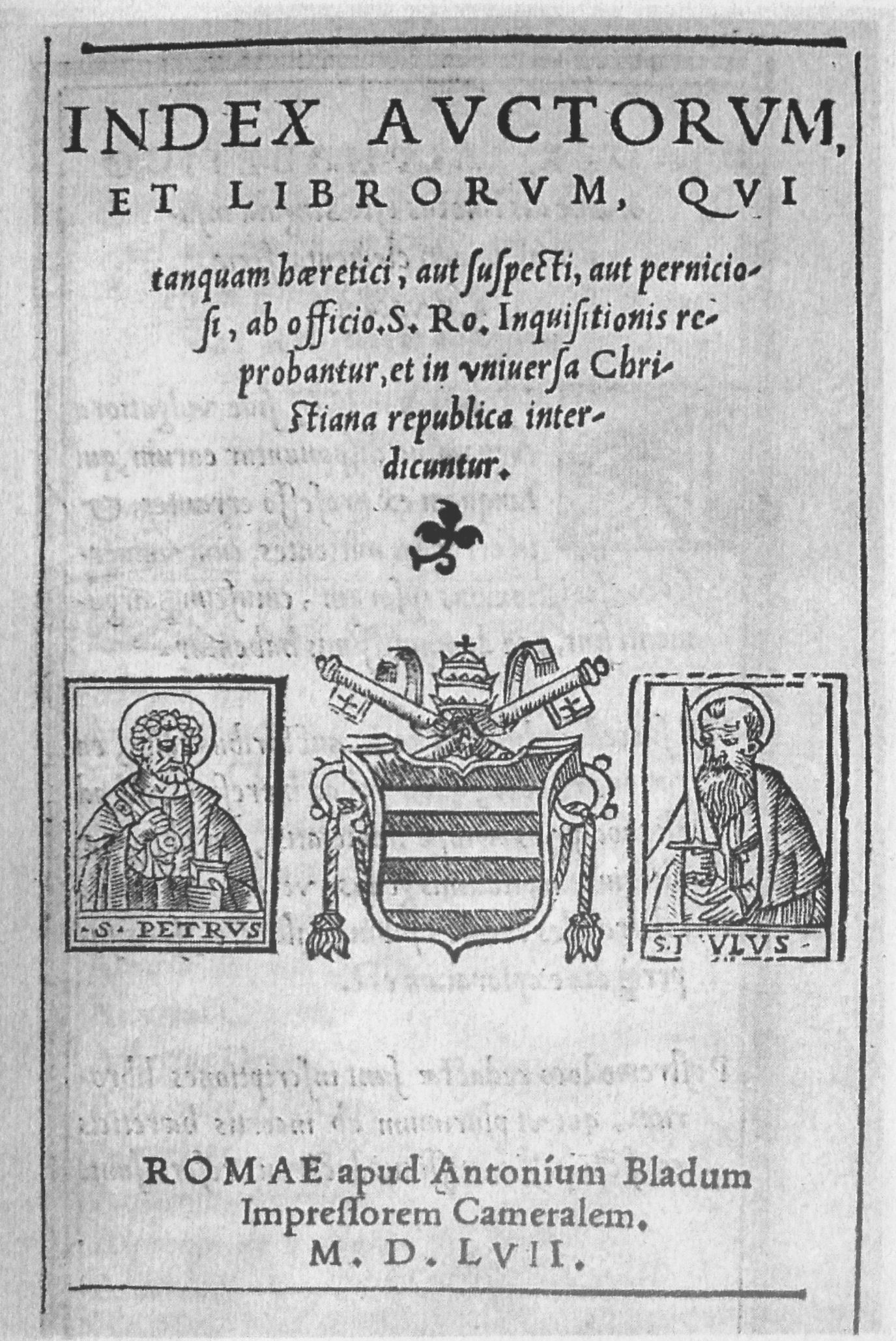
Fig 5: Index Librorum Prohibitorum printed by Antonio Blado "Impressorem Cameralem"

Blado worked with Annibale Caro, Antonio Salamanca, Paolo Manuzio among others. He produced a New Testament in the Ethiopic language with the Dorico brothers (1548-1549)

The output from his press was extremely wide-ranging. Over a thousand works remain, and they include historical and religious works, as well as the staples of translations of classic Greek and Latin texts. It even included works on medicine, horsemanship and one of the earliest printed chess manuals.

When printing under his own name, his printer's mark was a crowned eagle standing behind a draped cloth, with the initials A.B. See figure 1.

He died in Feb 1567 and is buried in San Lorenzo in Damaso. His widow, Paola remained responsible for the firm for 20 years. His children married into printing families: Agnese married Giovanni Osmarino Gigliotti, and Stefano married into the Dorico family.

== Notable Works ==
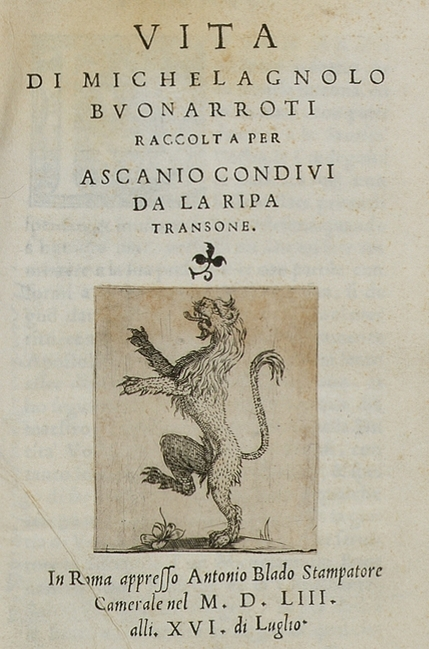
- Fig 6. Title page of Ascanio Condivi's ''Life of Michelagnolo Buonarroti'' (1553), printed by Antonio Blado while Stampatore Camerale.
  Machiavelli's The Prince (1532) - one of the earliest eiditions (Figure 3)
- Guillaume Philandrier: Annotationes (1544), an influential commentary on classical architecture
- Exercitia spiritualia of St. Ignatius of Loyola (1548)- the first official edition by Loyola, founder of the Jesuits
- Italian translation of Bartolomeo Marliani's Topographia (1548) - a guide to Rome for pilgrims, with a woodcut map
- Leonardo Bufalini: map of Rome (1551) (Figure 4)
- The Life of Michelangelo by Ascanio Condivi (1553) (Figure 6) - a contemporary authorised biography
- Camillo Agrippa's Trattato di scientia d'arme (1553) - an illustrated treatise on fencing
- Annibal Caro's satirical work of "figs" by Francesco Maria Molza (1539). Caro had portrayed Blado as "Barbagrigia" in his comedy Gli Straccioni
- Index librorum prohibitorum (1559) - A list of publications deemed heretical for Catholics (Figure 5)
