= Accademia della Virtù =

Renaissance humanist academy in Rome

L'Accademia della Virtù, or Vitruvian Academy was a cultural association founded in Rome in 1542 by the humanist Claudio Tolomei. The association was chaired by the scholar Marcello Cervini, an enthusiast of architecture, and future pope under the name Marcellus II. It consisted of a group of Italian Renaissance intellectuals and artists.

The Accademia met twice a week under the patronage of Cervini to read and discuss Vitruvius in the context of ancient monuments. This influenced architectural publications by Guillaume Philandrier and Giacomo Barozzi da Vignola which became reference works for architects up until the 19th century.

== Purpose ==
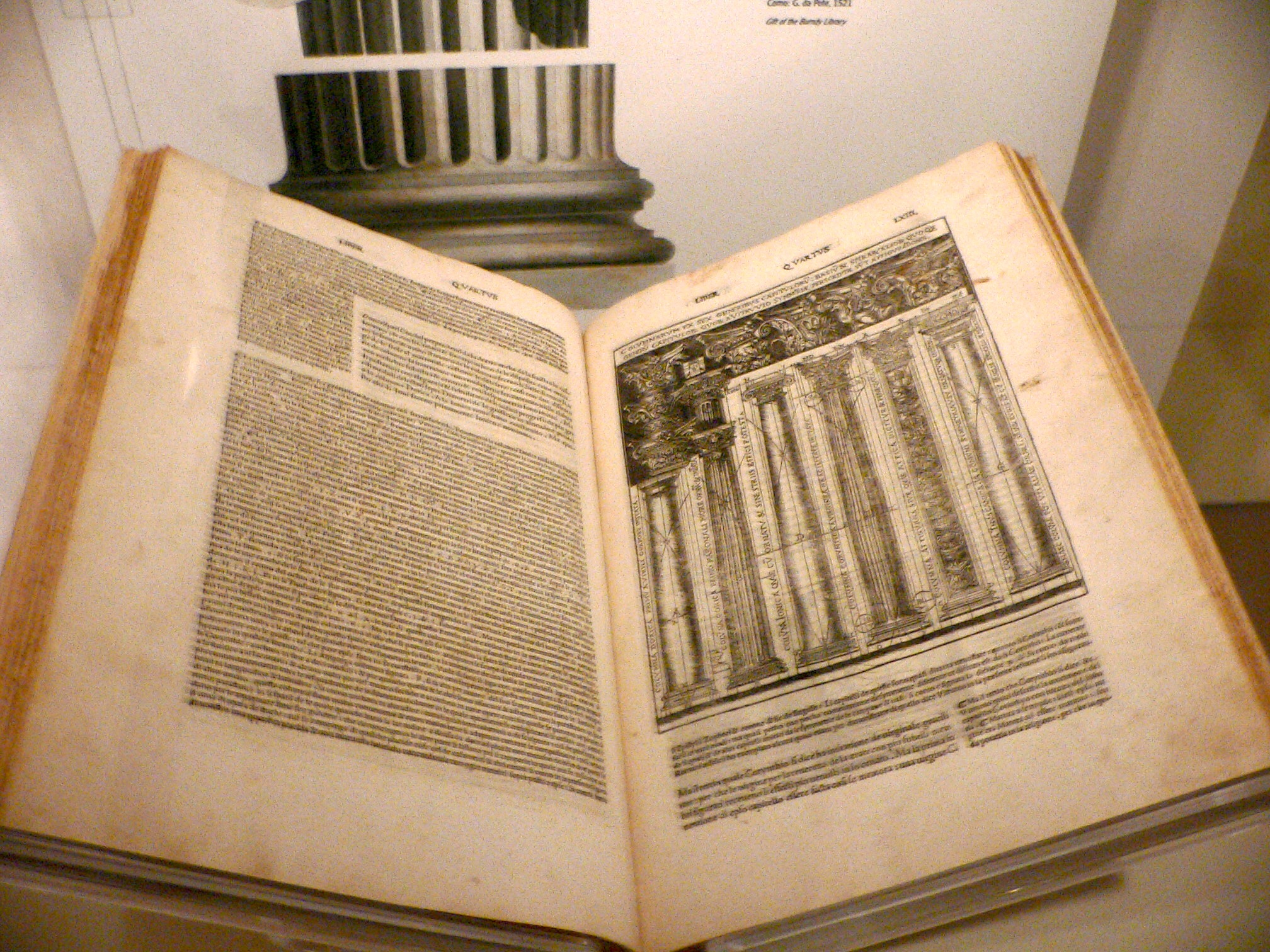
The subject of study of the Accademia was Vitruvius' De architectura, here in the first Italian version, translated in 1521, with extensive commentary, by Cesare Cesariano.

The Association aimed to promote the study of classical antiquity among artists, scholars and architects and to reclaim the heritage of Greek and Roman art and architecture. They also aimed to read, study and interpret the noted Latin work of Vitruvius, the De architectura. This work was the only treatise on architecture to survive from antiquity, and was regarded as the first known book on architectural theory, as well as a major source on the canon of classical architecture.

Vitruvius's work was "rediscovered" in 1416 by the Florentine humanist Poggio Bracciolini, who found it in the Abbey library of Saint Gall, Switzerland. The first printed edition was published by Fra Giovanni Sulpitius in 1486. Translations into Vernacular Italian were in circulation by the 1520s, the first in print being the translation with new illustrations by Cesare Cesariano, a Milanese friend of the architect Bramante, printed in Como in 1521. By the 1540s when the Accademia was launched, scholars were familiar with the work. For example in 1537 Sebastiano Serlio produced I Sette libri dell'architettura (Seven Books of Architecture), which drew heavily on Vitruvius.

Cervini had four manuscript copies of De architectura. As a humanist he encouraged the recovery, translation and study of ancient texts. He sponsored the reading and commentary of De architectura twice a week in the palace of Archbishop Francesco Colonna to read and discuss Vitruvius.

Claudio Tolomei described the goals of the Accademia in a letter in 1542, as follows

- To Produce a comprehensive edition of Vitruvius' De architectura
- To compile a comparative lexicon, so scholars could establish a direct relationship between the techniques described by Vitruvius and the architecture of the surviving ancient monuments
- To create a comprehensive survey of surviving classical remains (sculptures, inscriptions, buildings)

Recent scholarship suggests that the Accademia extended its activities beyond architecture, its members were also working on the reform of the Italian language and philological studies in (neo) Latin.

== Members ==
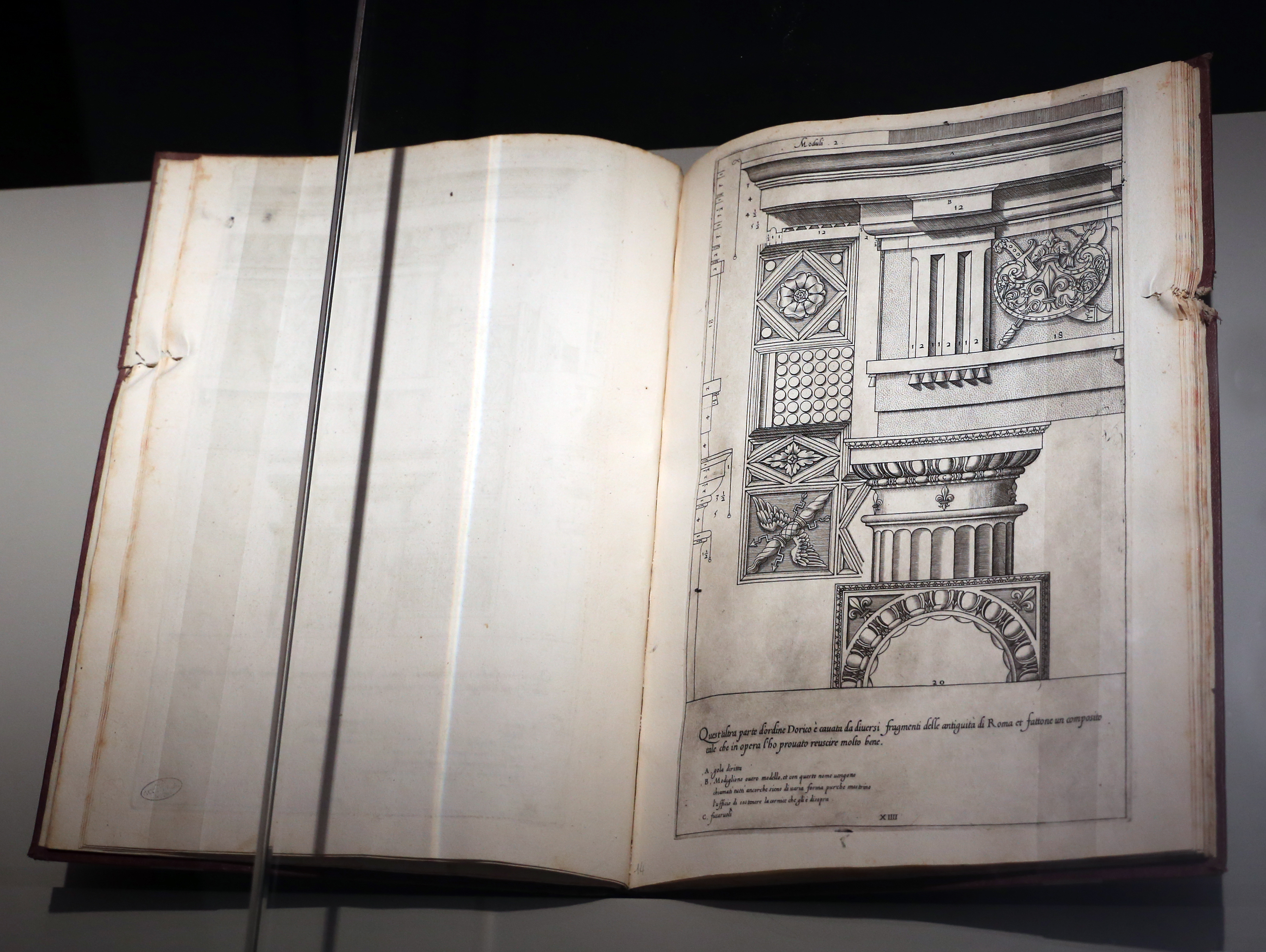
Vignola's Rule of the Five Orders of Architecture, considered the result of Vitruvian studies encouraged by the Academy

An exact number of members is not known, but some sources say around 200. Some of the prominent members included

- Giacomo Barozzi da Vignola - Architect; codified the five classical orders in The Five Orders of Architecture
- Bernardino Maffei - Humanist scholar and editor of classical texts
- Guillaume Philandrier - Renaissance commentator on Vitruvius
- Annibale Caro - Poet, translator and literary figure
- Marcantonio Flaminio - Humanist poet and religious reformer
- Francesco Maria Molza - Poet of the Roman Renaissance
- Francesco Paciotti - Architect and military engineer
- Pirro Ligorio - Architect and Painter
- Antonio Blado - Recruited by Cervini to be the printer for the Accademia and printer of many of the members' works

== Results ==
The initial objectives were too broad, but the readings and the meetings of the Accademia did produce results.

One of the academy's concerns was the destruction of ancient Roman monuments for building materials. In 1543 the antiquarian Pirro Ligorio criticised the removal of marble from the Roman Forum for use in the construction of St Peter's Basilica, despite the practice having papal approval.

In 1544, Guillaume Philandrier, (also known as Filandro) who was a pupil of Sebastiano Serlio in Venice, probably drew on his attendance at the academy during his stay in Rome to produce M. Vitruvium De architectura annotationes (1544) on the ten books of De architectura. He later published expanded editions in 1552 and 1586.

Between 1537 and 1540, during his first brief Roman period preceding his trip to France, Giacomo Barozzi da Vignola studied ancient monuments, taking measurements and drawing from them, prompted by Cervini and others. This was intended as a preparatory work as part of the Vitruvian studies pursued by the Academy. He drew on these studies in his later work as an architect.

In 1562 Vignola published Regola delli cinque ordini d'architettura (The Five Orders of Architecture), composed much earlier, around 1540, which was widely distributed throughout Europe until the nineteenth century. It is believed that the origin of that treatise was the cultural milieu of the Roman academicians and in that series of studies and drawings, now lost, that he executed in Rome on behalf of the Accademia.

== Legacy ==
Despite its powerful patron, and influential membership of contemporary scholars the Accademia never did complete its vision of a new annotated version of De architectura, reaching only book seven of the ten books of Vitruvius. But it did revive interest in Greek and Roman architecture, and this led to Guillaume Philandrier's In M. Vitruvium De architectura annotationes (1544), a commentary covering all ten books. and Vignola's Regola delli cinque ordini d'architettura.
