= Guillaume Philandrier =

French humanist and architectural scholar (1505-1565)

Guillaume Philandrier. Line engraving, 1688.

Guillaume Philandrier (also known as Philander or Filandro; 1505–1565) was a French humanist and architectural scholar, and a member of the Renaissance cultural association L'Accademia della Virtù. He is best known for his commentary on Vitruvius's De architectura, which combined analysis of sources with the study of ancient Roman monuments. His writings on the classical architectural orders influenced later architects such as Giacomo Barozzi da Vignola.

== Biography ==
Philandrier was born in Châtillon-sur-Seine in 1505.

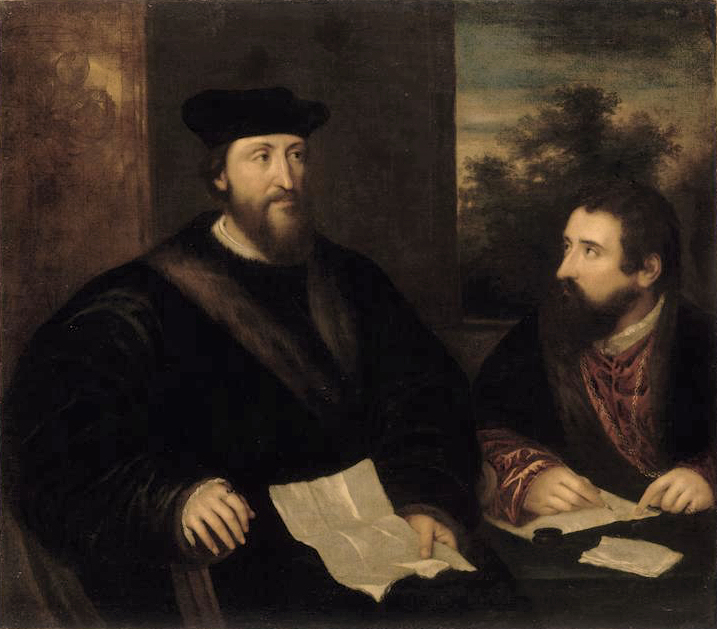
Georges d'Armagnac and his secretary Guillaume Philandrier by Titian (Louvre Museum)

He was a student of Jean Perréalwho was a painter, architect and sculptor. Later he became secretary to the Bishop of Rodez, Georges d'Armagnac who was appointed French ambassador to Venice (1536–1539). While in Venice he took the opportunity to sit to Titian for a double portrait with the Bishop. While in Venice he studied architecture under Sebastiano Serlio who was working on his influential Five Books of Architecture.

In 1540 D'Armagnac became ambassador to Pope Paul III and so Philandrier accompanied his patron to Rome (1540–1545). While in Rome he became a member of L'Accademia della Virtù, which was a cultural association founded in Rome in 1542. It was chaired by the scholar Marcello Cervini, an enthusiast of architecture, and future pope under the name Marcellus II. It consisted of a group of Italian Renaissance intellectuals and artists. The Accademia met twice a week under the patronage of Cervini to read and discuss Vitruvius in the context of ancient monuments.

== The Annotationes of Vitruvius ==
In M. Vitruvii Pollionis de Architectura Annotationes (1544) was the first major Renaissance commentary on Vitruvius's De architectura. Philandrier combined his understanding of the text with observations drawn from ancient Roman monuments. His philological analysis of the different manuscripts (Cervini had four copies) yielded numerous textual corrections to Vitruvius that influenced later editions.

More than a commentary, this illustrated treatise offers an interpretation of the text that would become a reference work among later Renaissance architects; he summarised the ideas of earlier scholars such as Leon Battista Alberti and his old mentor Sebastiano Serlio. He actually studied Roman ruins and monuments to produce his own interpretation of the five classical architectural orders described by Serlio (Tuscan, Doric, Ionic, Corinthian and Composite).

His analysis of existing monuments allowed him to come up with rules for proportions and required elements and he used the ancient monuments of Rome as reference. In addition he referenced antiquities that he wad seen in Naples, Verona and Ravenna. For his sources he made use of ancient Greek and Latin texts, medieval works and contemporary authors. He also used non-traditional sources, such as Arabic texts, numismatics (coins), inscriptions and other archaeological evidence.

This approach influenced many architects, including his contemporary, Giacomo Barozzi da Vignola. Daniele Barbaro and Claude Perrault both referred to Philander's work.

Philandrier was a theoretician who wrote for scholars, not draughtsmen, and used mainly text description. The illustrations he had were woodcuts of poor quality, and the small format (octavo) didn't help. There were errors in the illustrations such as mis-labelling, left-to-right reversals. Philandrier mainly communicated his ideas by text, not pictures. Later editions, such as the Lyon edition in 1552 improved the illustrations.

Giacomo Barozzi da Vignola's Regola delli cinque ordini d'architettura took a less scholarly and more visual approach. Vignola communicated by a simple visual system and it could be understood easily by draughtsmen and builders. It was published in the vernacular and became a reference for the classical architectural styles for hundreds of years.

== Later life ==
Our Lady Cathedral of Rodez, where Philandrier supervised architectural work on the facade

During his residence in Rome, Philandrier was granted Roman citizenship from the pope. This is why the title page of Annotationes says "Castilionii Galli civis Romani" ("of Châtillon, a Frenchman, Roman citizen").

He was a friend of the humanist François Rabelais.

He also wrote a commentary on Quintilian's "Oratorical Institutes", In Lyon in 1535.

He is credited with designing the pediment of the western façade and the gallery of the Notre-Dame Cathedral of Rodez, which was built by the architect Jean Salvanh. He also catalogued the Bishop's increasing library.

After returning from Italy to Rodez, Philandrier pursued an ecclesiastical career. In 1554, he was made canon of the cathedral and archdeacon.

He designed the tomb of Cardinal d'Armagnac in Toulouse Cathedral.

Philandrier died on February 18, 1565 during a visit to his former master in Toulouse. The archbishop had a mausoleum erected for him in his church.

== Notable works ==
- In M. Vitruvii Pollionis de Architectura Annotationes (1544) Printed by Giovanni Andrea Dossena, Rome (multiple editions)
- Castigationes atque annotationes pauculae in XII libros Institutionum M. Fabii Quintiliani (1545)- Notes and corrections on Quintilian's Institutio Oratoria.
- Epitome omnium Georgii Agricolae de mensuris et ponderibus librorum (1552)- A summary and discussion of Georgius Agricola's work on ancient weights and measures
