= Giacomo Barozzi da Vignola =

Italian architect (1507–1573)

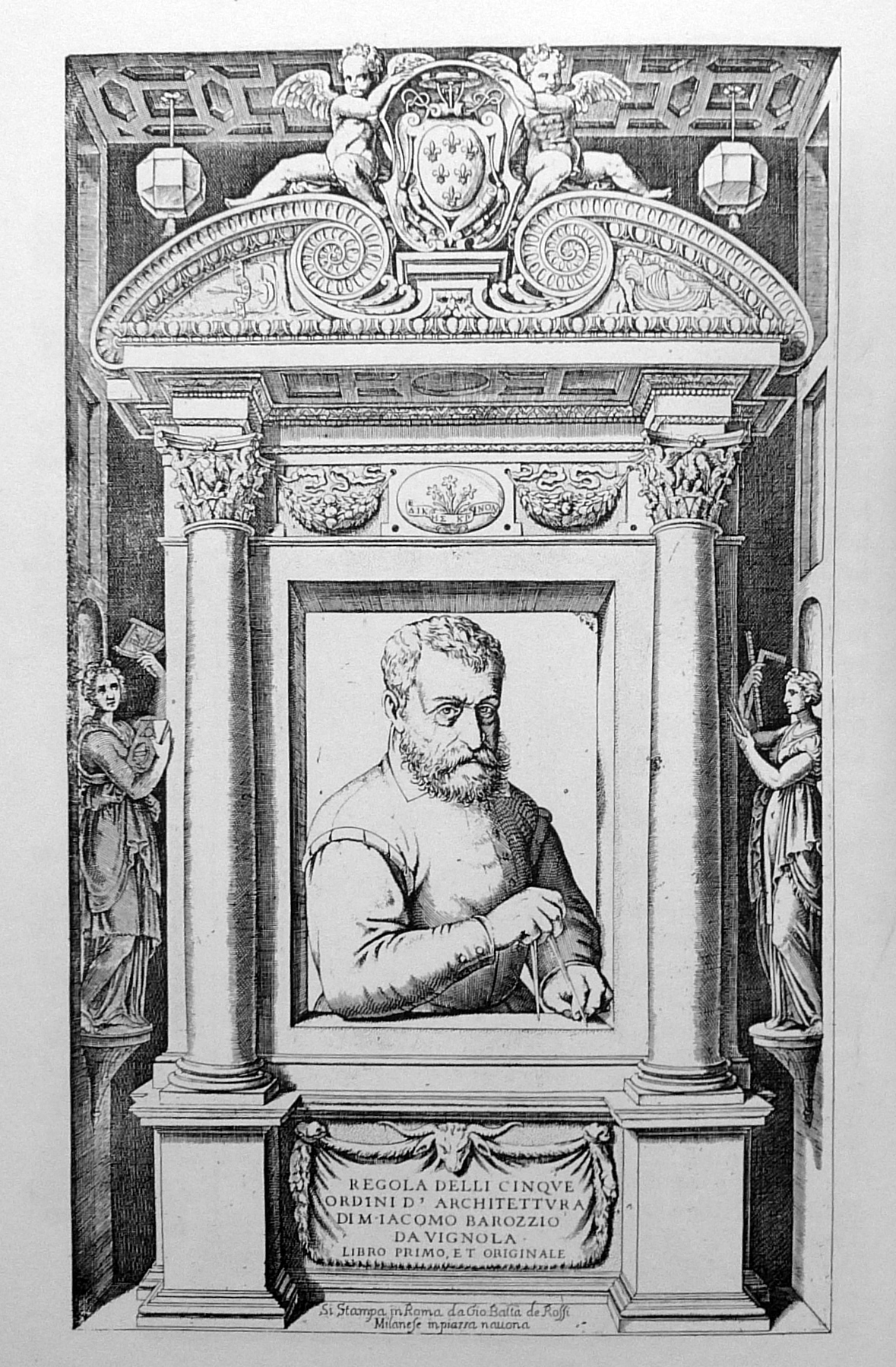
- Born: Jacopo (Note: or Jacopo) Barozzi (Note: or Barocchio) da Vignola; 1 October 1507; Vignola, Duchy of Ferrara (present-day Italy)
- Died: 7 July 1573 (aged 65); Rome, Papal States (present-day Italy)
- Known for: Architecture; garden design
- Notable work: Villa Farnese; Church of the Gesù; Villa Lante
- Movement: Mannerism

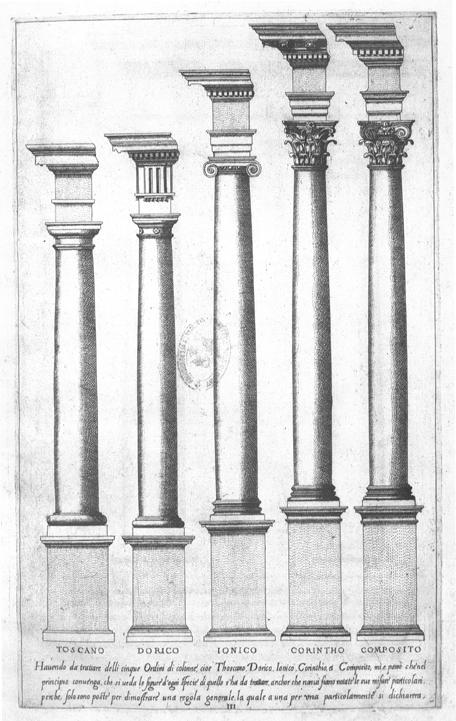
The five orders, engraving from Vignola's Regola delli cinque ordini d'architettura

Giacomo Barozzi da Vignola (UK: /vɪnˈjoʊlə/ vin-YOH-lə, US: /viːnˈ-/ veen-, Italian: [ˈdʒaːkomo baˈrɔttsi da (v)viɲˈɲɔːla]; 1 October 1507 – 7 July 1573), often simply called Vignola, was one of the great Italian architects of 16th-century Mannerism. His two great masterpieces are the Villa Farnese at Caprarola and the Jesuits' Church of the Gesù in Rome. The three architects who spread the Italian Renaissance style throughout Western Europe are Vignola, Serlio and Palladio. He is often considered the most important architect in Rome in the Mannerist era.

== Biography ==
Jacopo Barozzi was born at Vignola, near Modena (Emilia-Romagna).

He began his career as an architect in Bologna, supporting himself by painting and making perspective templates for inlay craftsmen. He made his first trip to Rome in 1536 to make measured drawings of Roman temples, with a thought to publish an illustrated Vitruvius. He was a member of the Accademia della Virtù which was formed in Rome in 1542 under the patronage of Marcello Cervini to prepare a new annotated edition of De architectura. Then François I called him to Fontainebleau, where he spent the years 1541–1543. Here he probably met his fellow Bolognese, the architect Sebastiano Serlio and the painter Primaticcio.

After his return to Italy, he designed the Palazzo Bocchi in Bologna. Later he moved to Rome. Here he worked for Pope Julius III and, after the latter's death, he was taken up by the papal family of the Farnese and worked with Michelangelo, who deeply influenced his style (see Works section for details of his works in this period).

In 1558, he was in Piacenza to revise the designs of Palazzo Farnese, commissioned by Margaret of Austria, wife of the Duke Ottavio Farnese and daughter of Emperor Charles V.

From 1564 Vignola carried on Michelangelo's work at St Peter's Basilica, and constructed the two subordinate domes according to Michelangelo's plans.

Jacopo Barozzi died in Rome in 1573. In 1973 his remains were reburied in the Pantheon, Rome.

== Works ==
=== Major architectural works ===
Vignola's main works include:

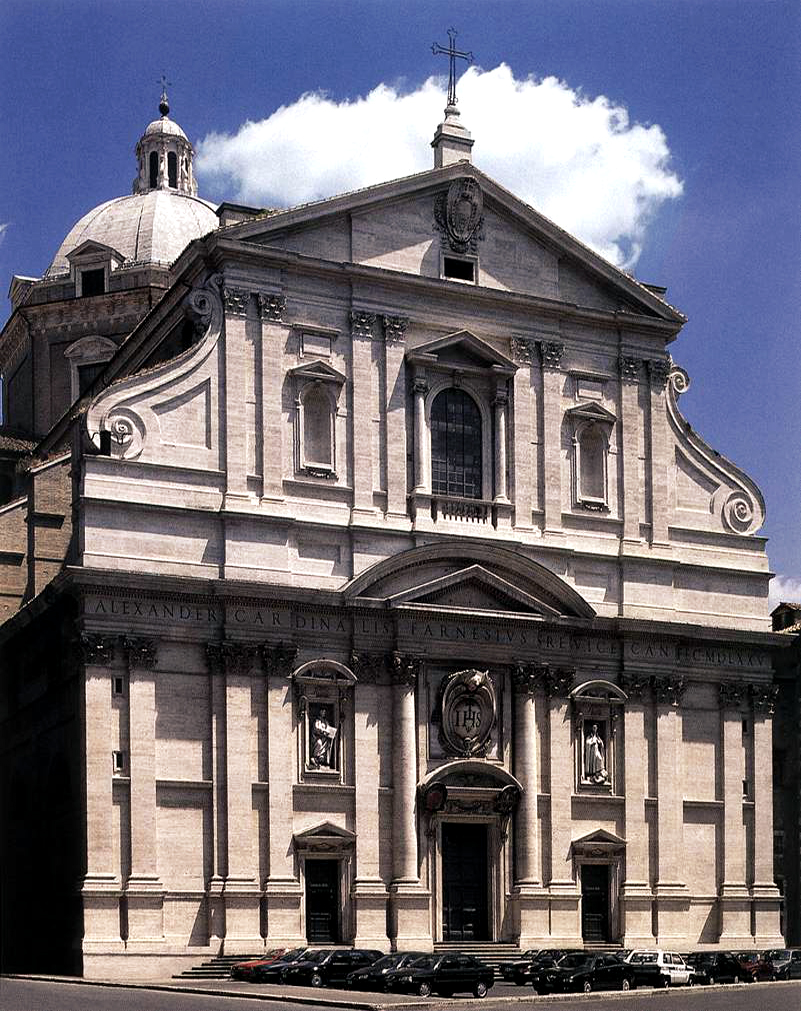
Church of the Gesù, Rome, also named Church of the Most Holy Name of Jesus at the "Argentina"

- Project for the facade of the Basilica of San Petronio (c. 1545), Bologna.
- Villa Giulia for Pope Julius III, in Rome (1550–1553). Here Vignola was working with Ammanati, who designed the nymphaeum and other garden features under the general direction of Vasari, with guidance from the knowledgeable pope and Michelangelo. A medal of 1553 shows Vignola's main villa substantially as it was completed, save for a pair of cupolas.
- Villa Farnese at Caprarola (1559–1573);
- Villa Lante at Bagnaia (1566 onwards), including the gardens and their water features and casini;
- Chiesa del Gesù, Rome, the mother church of the Jesuit order, which would become a source for Baroque church facades in the 17th century;
- Basilica of Santa Maria degli Angeli, Assisi (with Galeazzo Alessi);
- Church of Sant'Andrea in Via Flaminia, Rome, the first church to have an oval dome, which became a signature of the Baroque.
- Palazzo dei Banchi, Bologna
- Palazzo Farnese, Piacenza. This was a grandiose project of a vast palace on a scale paralleled only by the Vatican Palace in Italy; the rectangular plan is circa 111 metres by 88 metres. The actual construction, however, made up only less than half of Vignola's original project and lacked many of the planned architectural features; missing elements include part of the exterior surrounding walls, the main façade, modelled on the ancient triumphal arch and with a large tower, and a theatre in the large inner courtyard.
- St. Peter's Basilica in the Vatican, assumed the role of chief architect after the death of Michelangelo Buonarroti.
- Palazzo Contrari Boncompagni, Vignola.
- Church of Santa Maria dell'Orto (1576–1578), Rome; only the facade is by Vignola.
- Orti Farnesiani to Palatine, Rome.
- Project of the Church of Sant'Anna dei Palafrenieri in Vatican City (c. 1570), with the plan and oval dome inserted in a rectangle, made by Giacinto Barozzi. The scheme will be taken up by many architects baroque.

=== Other architectural works ===
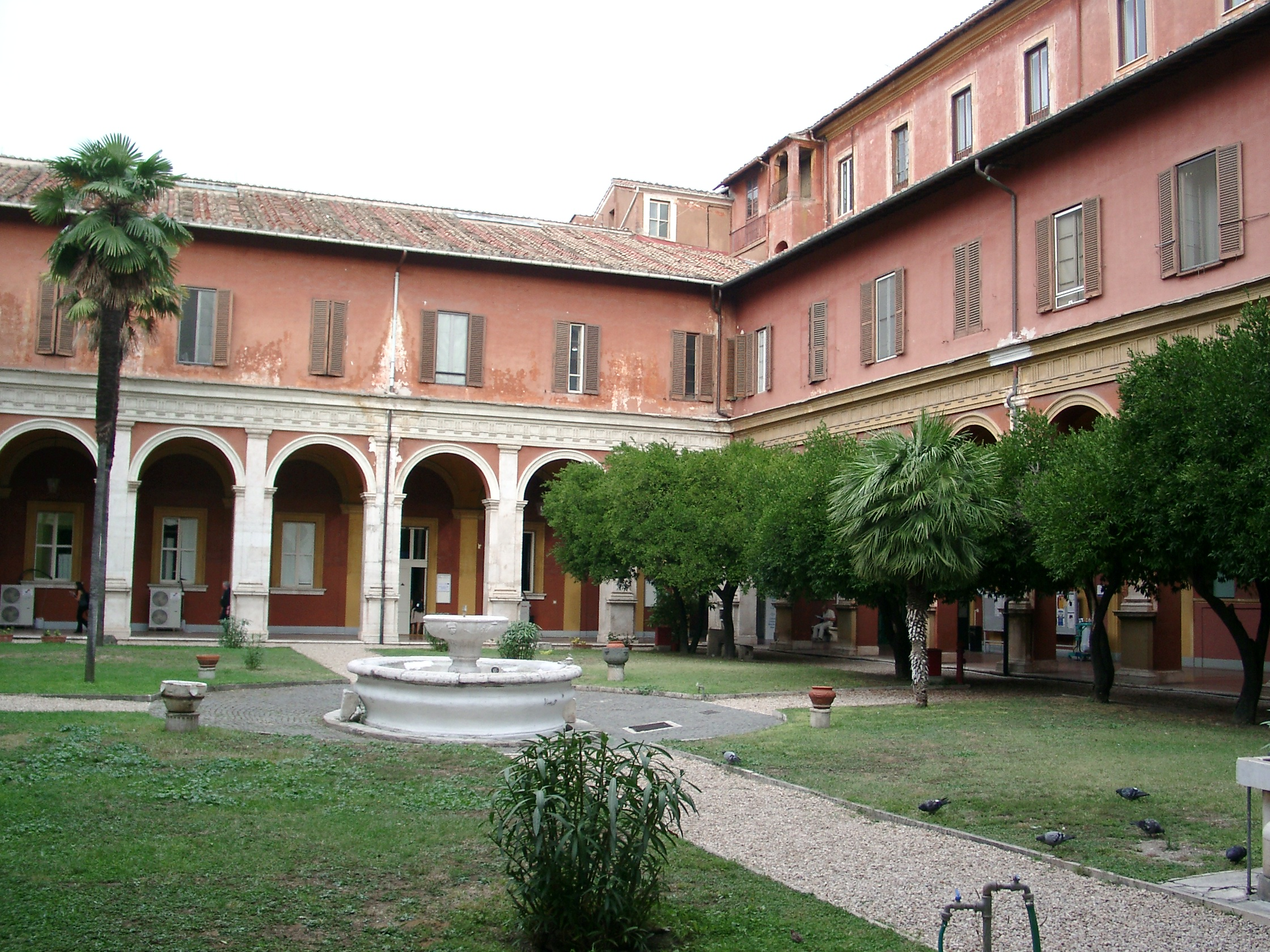
Cloister of the Pontifical University of Saint Thomas Aquinas, Angelicum is traditionally attributed to Vignola but completed after his death. Ten arches on the long sides and seven on the short are sustained by pilasters with Tuscan-style ornamentation that rise from high plinths. A simple frieze with smooth triglyphs and metopes separates the lower from the upper levels.

- Bassano Romano: Villa Giustiniani Odescalchi.
- Bomarzo: Temple in the Park of the Monsters.
- Caprarola:
  - Church of San Marco.
  - Hospital of San Giovanni.
- Capranica: Church of the Madonna del Piano.
- Collevecchio: Palazzo Pistolini.
- Fara Sabina: Tabernacle of Sant'Antonio Martire.
- Farfa: Works at Abbey consisting of a fountain and a mill.
- Grotte di Castro: Town hall (project of 1568), later altered.
- Gallese: Palazzo Ducale
- Isola Bisentina: Church of Saints Giacomo and Cristoforo (1562), built by the pupil Antonio Garzoni from Viggiù.
- Isola Farnese: Castle.
- Latera: Palazzo Farnese (1550).
- Monte Porzio Catone: Villa mondragone
- Nepi:
  - Aqueduct of Nepi.
  - Works at the Monastery of San Domenico; difficult to identify interventions, including hydraulic works.
- Oriolo Romano:
  - Piazza Umberto I and the Fountain of the Spades
  - Palazzo Altieri.
- Poli: Villa Catena, the parts attributable to Vignola are not certain.
- Rieti:
  - Palazzo del Seminario, obtained from the transformation of pre-existing buildings.
  - Church of Sant'Antonio Abate.
- Rome:
  - Church of Santa Caterina dei Funari, Ricci or Ruiz Chapel.
  - Church of Santa Maria Scala Coeli with Giacomo della Porta
  - Church of Santa Maria in Transpontina.
  - Works in San Lorenzo in Damaso and portal of the Chancellery.
  - Palazzo Borghese.
  - Palazzo Farnese (Rome).
  - Palazzo Firenze (courtyard).
  - Palazzo del Vignola to Piazza Navona.
  - Palazzetto Spada.
  - The main courtyard of the Pontifical University of Saint Thomas Aquinas, Angelicum, formerly the convent of the Church of Santi Domenico e Sisto.
  - Porta del Popolo.
- Soriano nel Cimino: Palazzo Albani.
- Sant'Oreste sul Soratte:
  - Church of San Lorenzo; the construction was not followed by Vignola and only partially reflects the original project.
  - Palazzo Caccia Canali.
- Vallerano: Church of the Madonna del Ruscello
- Vejano: Funerary shrine of Santacroce family; chapel located in the centre of the medieval village, of uncertain attribution.
- Velletri: City Hall; with Giacomo della Porta.
- Vetralla:
  - Porta Romana; of uncertain attribution.
  - Franciosoni Palace; of ancient attribution and Vignolesque school.
- Vignanello: Castello Ruspoli; of uncertain attribution.
- Viterbo:
  - Porta Faulle
  - Fountain of Piazza della Rocca; commissioned by the Farnese.
- Palazzo Bocchi (1545), Bologna.
- Palazzo Boncompagni, Bologna.
- Staircase in the Palazzo Isolani, Bologna.
- Palazzo Bufalini (1562), Città di Castello.
- Palazzo Nobili-Tarugi, Montepulciano.
- La Castellina (1554), Norcia.
- Palazzo del Giardino, Parma.
- Rocca di San Giorgio, San Giorgio Piacentino.
- Temple of Santa Maria della Consolazione, Todi.

=== Unbuilt works ===
Like many other architects, Vignola submitted his plans for completing the facade of San Petronio, Bologna. Designs by Vignola, in company with Baldassare Peruzzi, Giulio Romano, Andrea Palladio and others furnished material for an exhibition in 2001

=== Written works ===
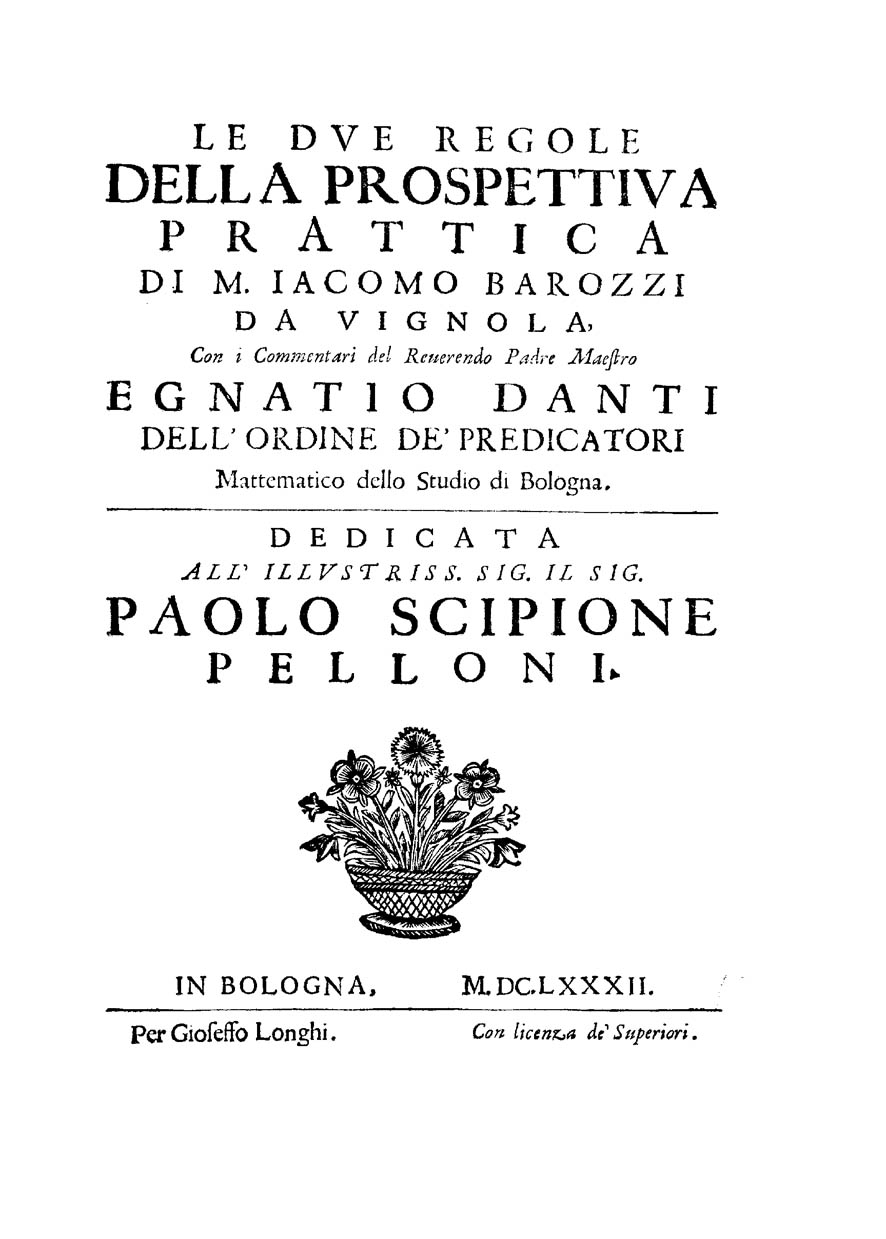
Le due regole della prospettiva prattica, 1682

His two published books helped formulate the canon of classical architectural style. The earliest, Regola delli cinque ordini d'architettura ["Canon of the five orders of architecture"] (first published in 1562, probably in Rome), presented Vignola's practical system for constructing columns in the five classical orders (Tuscan, Doric, Ionic, Corinthian and Composite) utilising proportions which Vignola derived from his own measurements of classical Roman monuments. The clarity and ease of use of Vignola's treatise caused it to become in succeeding centuries the most published book in architectural history. Vignola's second treatise, Due regole della prospettiva pratica ["Two rules of practical perspective"], published posthumously with extensive commentary by the mathematician Ignazio Danti (Bologna 1583), favours one-point perspective rather than two-point methods such as the bifocal construction. Vignola presented— without theoretical obscurities— practical applications which could be understood by a prospective patron.

== Bibliography ==
- Giorgio Vasari. Le Vite de' più eccellenti pittori, scultori, e architettori [Lives of the Most Excellent Painters, Sculptors, and Architects] (in Italian). Vol. IV (1568 ed.). pp. 94–95.
- G.K. Loukomski (1927). Vignole (Jacopo Barozzi da Vignola) (in French). Paris. (Remains a standard monograph.)
- Tutto Rinascimento (in Italian). De Agostini. 2011. ISBN 978-88-418-6490-6.
- Egnatio Danti (2003) [1583]. Les deux règles de la perspective pratique de Vignole (in French). Paris: Pascal Dubourg Glatigny. ISBN 2-271-06105-9.
- Chisholm, Hugh, ed. (1911). "Barocchio, Giacomo" . Encyclopædia Britannica. Vol. 3 (11th ed.). Cambridge University Press. p. 417.
- Johann-Karl Schmidt: Zu Vignolas Palazzo Bocchi in Bologna, in: Mitteilungen des Kunsthistorischen Institutes in Florenz, XIII, 1967.
