= The Five Orders of Architecture =

1562 book by Giacomo Barozzi da Vignola

- Modern English language cover
- Author: Giacomo Barozzi da Vignola
- Original title: Regola delli cinque ordini d'architettura
- Language: Italian
- Subject: Classical architecture
- Publication date: 1562
- Publication place: Italy

The Five Orders of Architecture (Regola delli cinque ordini d'architettura) is a book on classical architecture by Giacomo Barozzi da Vignola from 1562, and is considered "one of the most successful architectural textbooks ever written", despite having no text apart from the notes and the introduction. Originally published in Italian as Regola delli cinque ordini d'architettura, it has been fully or partially translated in English with different titles, including Canon of the Five Orders of Architecture; Rules of the Five Orders of Architecture; Vignola: an elementary treatise on architecture comprising the complete study of the five orders, with indication of their shadows and the first principles of construction; The Five Orders of Architecture according to Giacomo Barozzio of Vignola, to Which are Added the Greek Orders; and The five orders of architecture, the casting of shadows and the first principles of construction based on the system of Vignola.

== Contents ==
The book tackles the five orders, Tuscan, Doric, Ionic, Corinthian, and composite in separate sections, each subdivided into five parts on the colonnade, arcade, arcade with pedestal, individual pedestals, and entablatures and capitals. Following those 25 sections were some less related parts on cornices and other elements. Written during the 1550s, the book was published in 1562, and was soon considered the most practical work for the application of the five orders. Apart from the introduction, the book consisted solely of 32 annotated plates, with views from the Pantheon illustrating the Corinthian order and the Theatre of Marcellus illustrating the Doric order. Later editions had more illustrations.

== Author ==
Vignola was an Italian Renaissance architect, assisting Michelangelo during his work on the St. Peter's Basilica. He was one of the architects of the Palazzo Farnese and the Church of the Gesu. Following the examples of the Classical Roman work of Vitruvius and the five books of the Regole generali d'architettura by Sebastiano Serlio published from 1537, Vignola started writing an architecture rule book on the classical orders. His work was more practical than the preceding two books which were more philosophical in nature.

== Editions and translations ==
For centuries it has been reprinted, translated, and used as an inspiration, e.g. for William Robert Ware's main work The American Vignola of 1904. By 1700, it had been reprinted fifteen times in Italian, and translated into Dutch, English, French, German, Russian and Spanish. By the end of the twentieth century, more than 250 editions of the book had been published, making it "the most widely used architectural textbook of all up to the nineteenth century [...] forming one of the universal bases of courses of architecture".

== Gallery ==
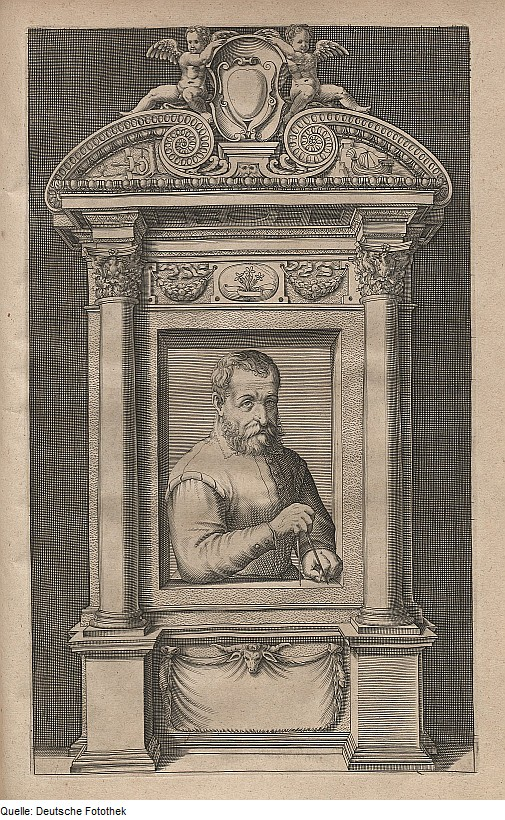
Titlepage of the book

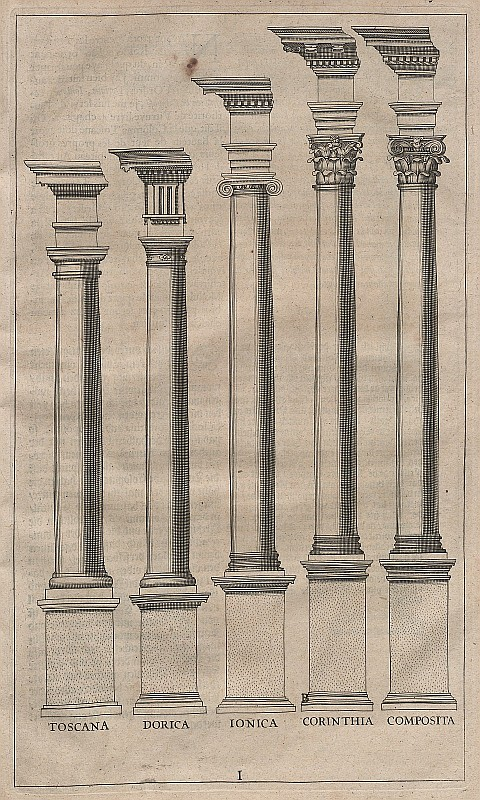
The five orders, plate I of the Five Orders.

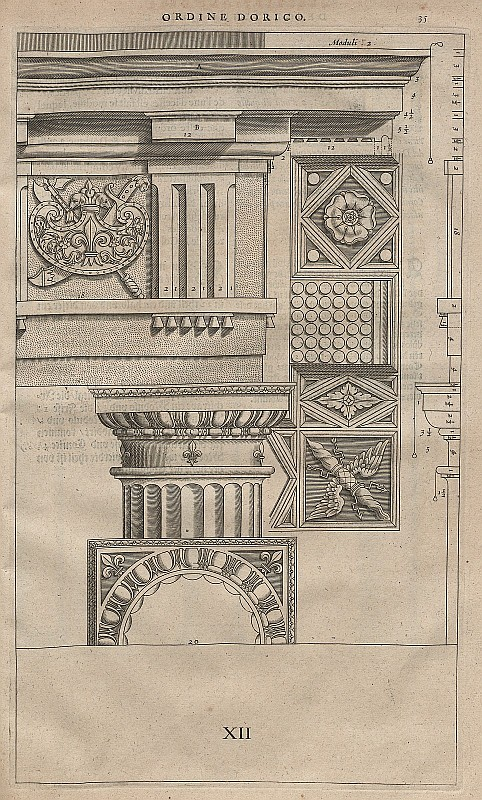
The Doric Order, plate XII of the Five Orders.

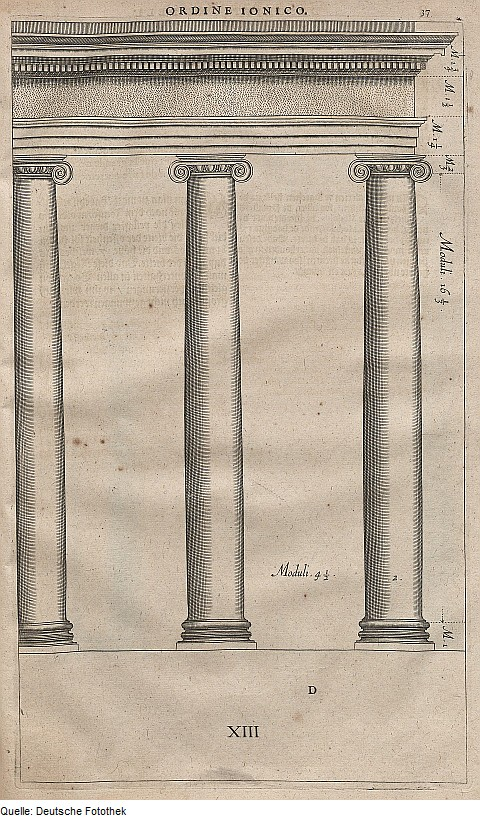
The Ionic order

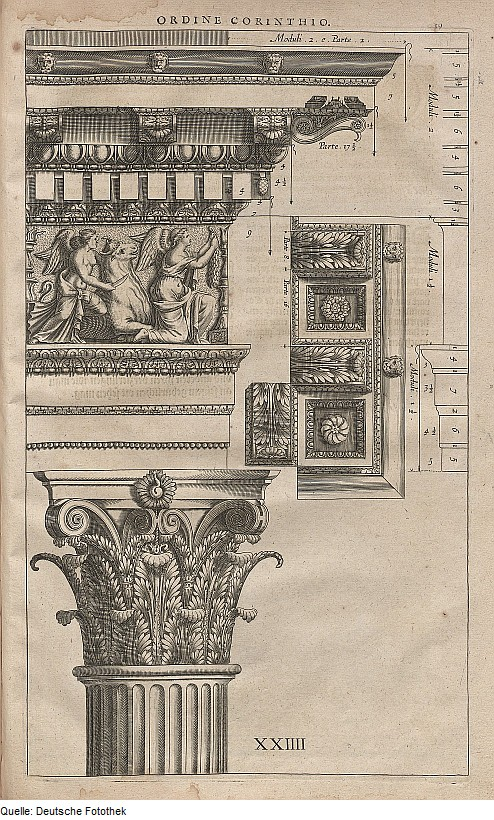
The Corinthian Order

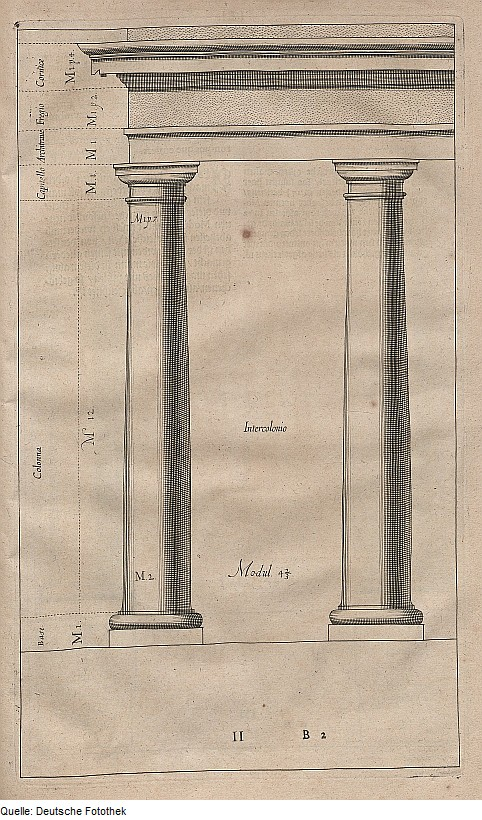
The Tuscan order

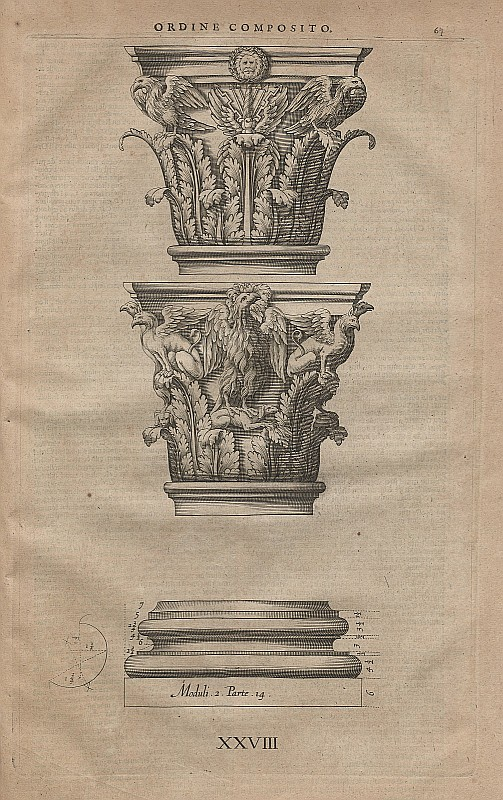
The capital of a Composite Order column, plate XXVIII of the Five Orders.
