= Sebastiano Serlio =

Italian architect and painter (1475–1554)

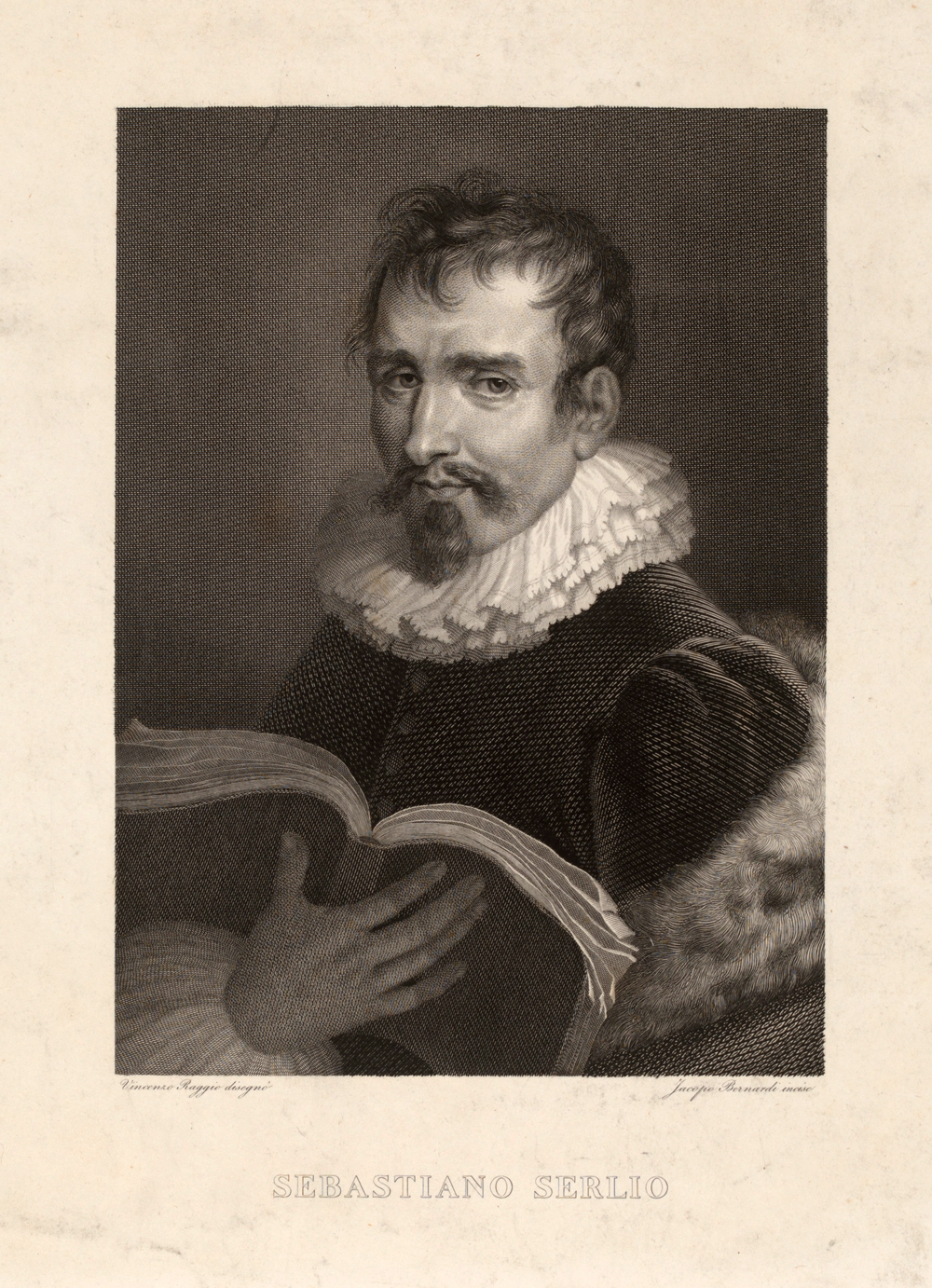
- Fanciful portrait of Serlio (print by Vincenzo Raggio)
- Born: 6 September 1475; Bologna, Papal States
- Died: c. 1554 (aged 78–79); Fontainebleau, Kingdom of France
- Occupation: Architect
- Projects: I Sette libri dell'architettura

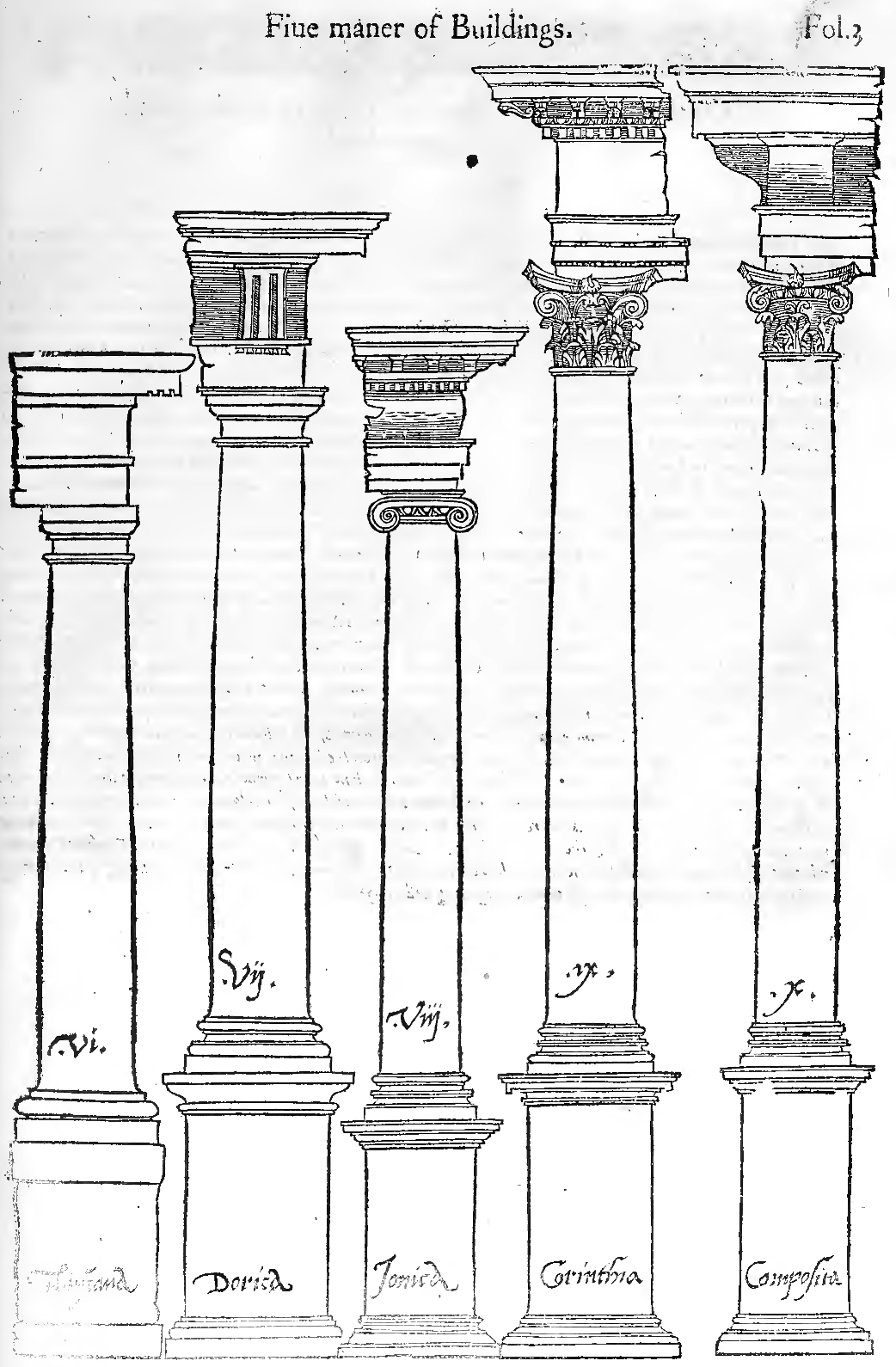
Serlio's canon of the five orders of architecture

Sebastiano Serlio (6 September 1475 – c. 1554) was an Italian Mannerist architect, who was part of the Italian team building the Palace of Fontainebleau. Serlio helped canonize the classical orders of architecture in his influential treatise variously known as I sette libri dell'architettura ("Seven Books of Architecture") or Tutte l'opere d'architettura et prospetiva ("All the works on architecture and perspective").

== Early life ==
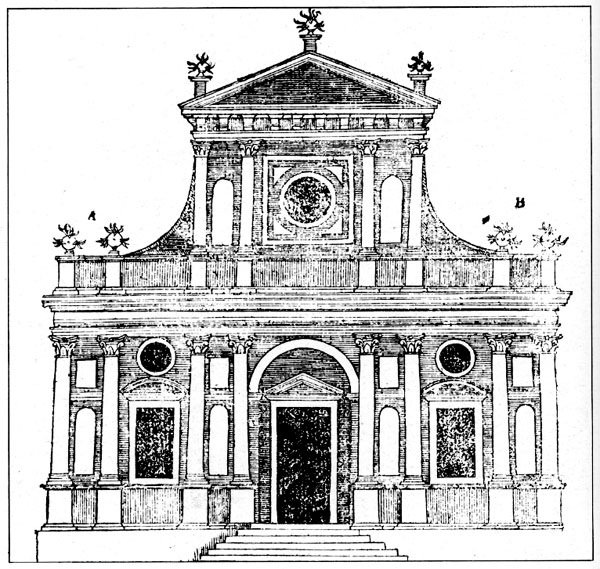
Serlio's model of a church façade of 1537 crystallized a format that lasted into the 18th century.

Born in Bologna, Serlio went to Rome in 1514, and worked in the atelier of Baldassare Peruzzi, where he stayed until the Sack of Rome in 1527 put all architectural projects on hold for a time. Like Peruzzi, he began as a painter. He lived in Venice from about 1527 to the early 1540s but left little mark on the city.

Serlio's model of a church façade was a regularized version, cleaned up and made more classical, of the innovative method of providing a façade to a church with a high vaulted nave flanked by low side aisles, providing a classical face to a Gothic form, that was first seen in Alberti's Santa Maria Novella in Florence (c. 1458). The idea was in the air in the 1530s: several contemporary churches compete for primacy, but Serlio's woodcut put the concept in every architect's hands. As a civil engineer he designed fortifications.

Serlio's publications, rather than any spectacular executed work, attracted the attention of François I. Serlio's career took off when the king invited him to France, to advise on the construction and decoration of the Château of Fontainebleau, where a team of Italian designers and craftsmen were assembled (including Giacomo Barozzi da Vignola and Benvenuto Cellini). Serlio took several private commissions, but the only one that has survived in any recognizable way is the Chateau of Ancy-le-Franc, built about 1546 near Tonnerre in Burgundy.

Serlio died around 1554 in the Fontainebleau section of Paris, after spending his last years in Lyon.

== Treatise on architecture ==
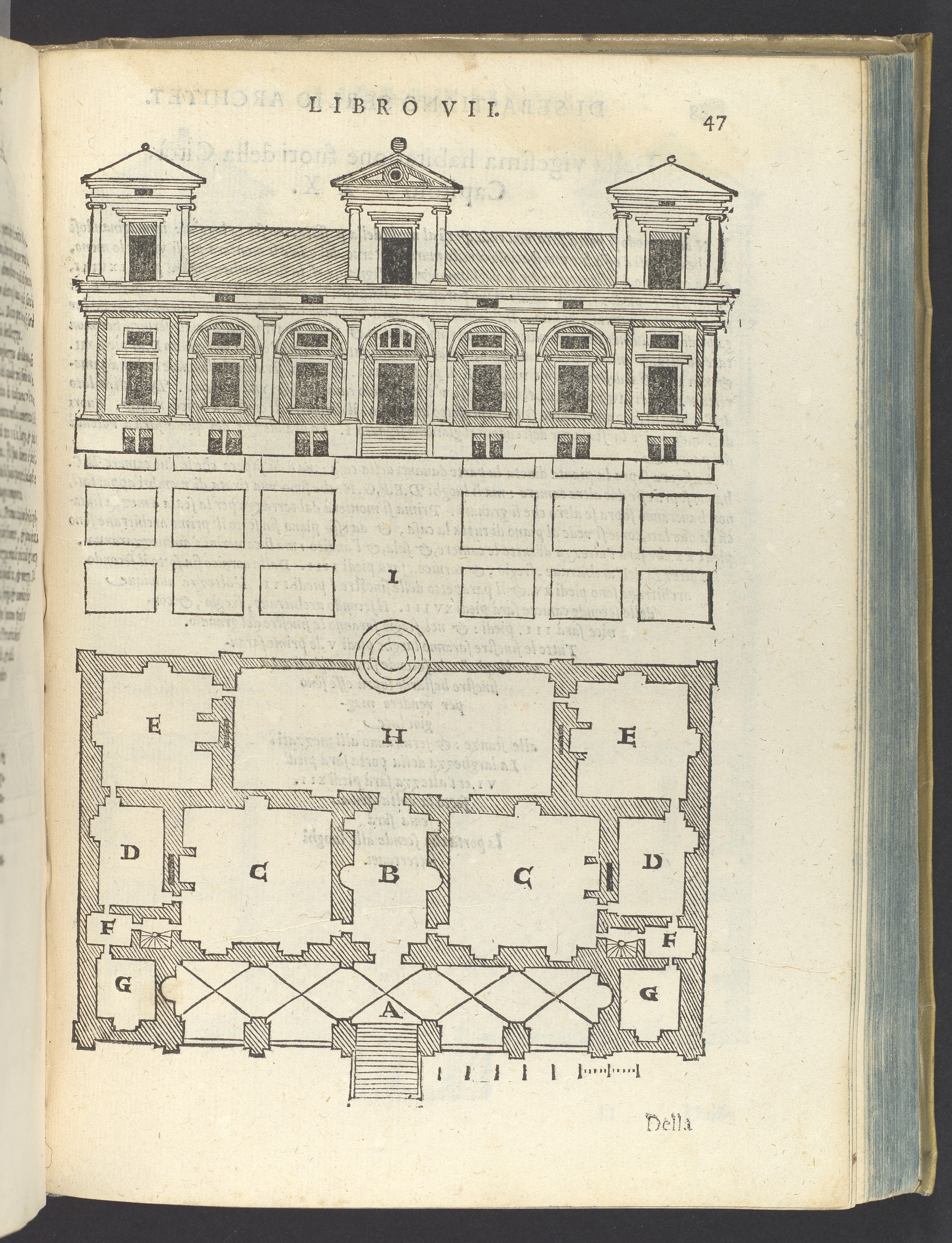
A page from the seventh book

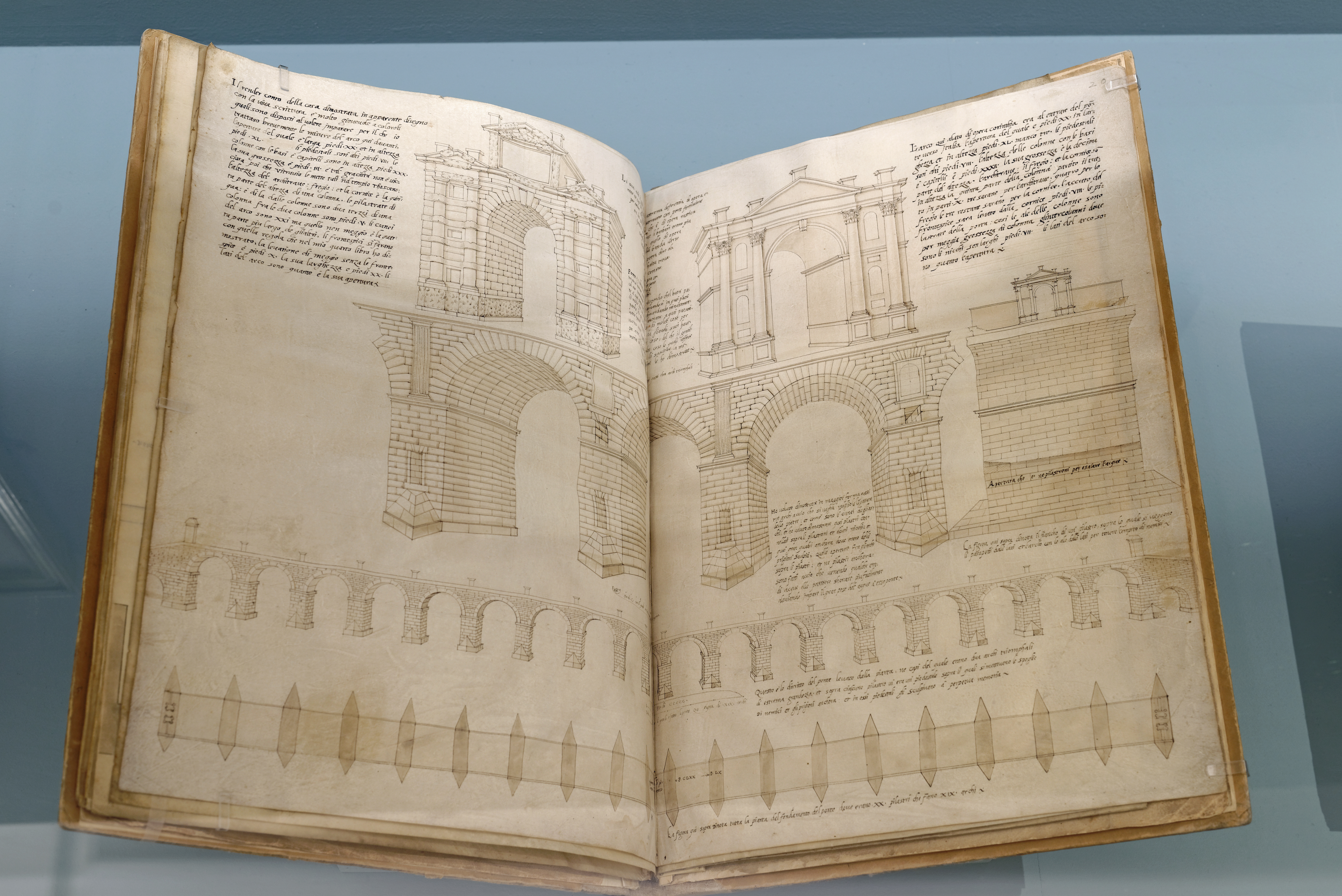
Two pages from the eighth book

Tutte l'opere d'architettura et prospetiva (All the Works of Architecture and Perspective) is Serlio's practical treatise on architecture. Although Leon Battista Alberti produced the first book-length architectural treatise of the Renaissance (c. 1450, published in 1486), it was unillustrated, written in Latin, and designed to appeal as much to learned humanists and potential patrons as to architects and builders. Serlio pioneered the use of high quality illustrations to supplement the text. He wrote in Italian, some of his books being published with parallel texts in Italian and French. His treatise catered explicitly to the needs of architects, builders, and craftsmen.

The treatise is composed of eight books, the sixth of which was lost for some centuries and the eighth of which was not published until relatively recently. The eighth book is not always considered to be part of the treatise. The first five books cover Serlio's works on geometry, perspective, Roman antiquity, the orders and church design. The sixth illustrates domestic designs ranging from peasant huts to royal palaces, providing a unique record of Renaissance house types, including up-to-date fortresses for tyrants and mercenaries as well as Serlio's unbuilt design for the Louvre. The seventh book illustrates a range of common design problems ignored by past theorists, including how to remodel, or 'restore', Gothic façades following antique principles of symmetry and proportion. The eighth book, called "Castrametation of the Romans", reconstructs a Roman encampment after the description by Polybius, followed by a military city and monumental bridge supposedly built by the Emperor Trajan. With its forum, consul's palace and baths, the book is part-fantasy and part-archaeology, quite unlike Serlio's other more practical works.

In the introduction to Book IV, Serlio credits his recently deceased mentor for much of its content: "As for all the pleasant things which you will find in this book, you should give the credit not to me but to my teacher, Baldassare Peruzzi from Siena..." The extent of Peruzzi's contribution to the treatise is unknown. "Peruzzi had been the guiding spirit in the detailed study of the remains of antiquity, and he had left his drawings to Serlio. Vasari and Cellini would give most of the credit for the book to Peruzzi, but more recent writers defend Serlio's part in the study and his good faith in completing the work of his companion."

=== Plan and publication ===
By 1537, when the earliest of his books was published, Serlio had been working on the treatise for at least a decade and had already organized it as a work in seven books. Although Serlio completed all seven projected books, only the first five books were published during his lifetime. The sixth remained in manuscript until the 20th century. He composed two additional books, which can be thought of as appendices: the Extraordinary Book of Doors, the last book he saw through the press; and On Polybius' Castrametation, a discussion of ancient Roman military camp design, whose state of completion and intended relation to the other books are both uncertain.

Publication order of the books, compared with Serlio's numerical order:
4	1537 Venice	On the Five Styles of Buildings
3	1540 Venice	On Antiquities
1	2	1545 Paris	On Geometry, On Perspective
5	1547 Paris	On Temples
X	1551 Lyon	Extraordinary Book of Doors
7	1575 Frankfurt	On Situations (posthumous)
6	1966 Milan	On Habitations (posthumous; MS facsimile)
Y	1994 Milan	On Polybius' Castrametation (posthumous)

It is not certain what title, if any, Serlio intended for the work as a whole—possibly General Rules of Architecture, as is given on the first-published book, but this soon became attached specifically to that book. Various collections were known as the Five or Seven Books on Architecture, depending on their content. Often it is referred to simply as Serlio's Architettura, and several significant editions take the title Tutte l'opere d'architettura et prospetiva ("All the works on architecture and perspective"); though the first time that all nine existing books (or even all seven numbered books) were in fact published in a single edition was in the 2-volume English translation of 1996–2001.

=== Content ===
Although the books apparently appeared more or less in Serlio's desired publication order, his nominal order provides a distinct flow from general to specific:

Serlio's reader moves from: first, the Euclidean 'heaven' composed of the definitions of geometry comprising point, line and perfect (square) planes; second, the underlying, three-dimensional forms of Nature represented through the theory of perspective; third, the architectural embodiment of perfect form reflected in the Pantheon and the 'idealised' monuments of antiquity; fourth, the rules of the Orders, progressing from Tuscan to Composite, as evidenced in antique ruins and the text of Vitruvius, and the universality of the Orders in composing doors, fireplaces and palace façades; fifth, the use of the Orders in temples of Serlio's invention; sixth, the use of the Orders in house designs (again graded, ascending from hut to palace); concluding at the lowest, seventh stage with 'accidents' or practical problems which the architect might encounter.

Significantly, the last few pages of the second book, "On Perspective", contain three theatrical scenes (comic, tragic, and satiric) and a stage plan and cross section which were highly influential in Renaissance theater.

In Aesthetics point of view Serlio is one of the first that use the expression fine arts: "and lately Leo X father and patron of all fine arts and all good artists".

=== Influence ===
Serlio's volumes were highly influential in France, the Netherlands and England as a conveyor of the Italian Renaissance style, and quickly became available in a variety of languages. His plans and elevations of many Roman buildings provided useful repertory of classical images, often reprinted.

One of his pupils was French humanist and architectural scholar Guillaume Philandrier who went on to publish In M. Vitruvii Pollionis de Architectura Annotationes (1544) one of the major Renaissance commentaries on Vitruvius.

Within five years of its original publication, the Flemish scholar Pieter Coecke van Aelst published, in Antwerp, adaptations of Book IV in Flemish, German, and French; Serlio considered these unauthorized versions of his work to be inferior forgeries; nevertheless they served as significant vectors in the spread of his influence. Coecke van Aelst's pupil the Dutch architect and engineer Hans Vredeman de Vries propagated Serlio's style and ornaments north of the Alps. And a Dutch version of Books I-V -- published in Amsterdam in 1606 and based largely on Coecke van Aelst's work in Flemish—served as the basis for the English translation of Books I-V published by Robert Peake in London in 1611. Fourth-hand though it was, it remained the most complete English edition of Serlio for almost four centuries. Its example countered the influence of the engravings of Antwerp Mannerism that were the main inspiration for Jacobean architecture. Later Serlio's book was in the libraries of Sir Christopher Wren and John Wood, the Elder the architect and entrepreneur who laid out Bath. Inigo Jones possessed Italian editions, which he annotated.

Books III & IV were published in Spanish in 1552 in Toledo by Juan de Ayala with the same illustrations as the original Italian editions.

Examples of Serlio's influence

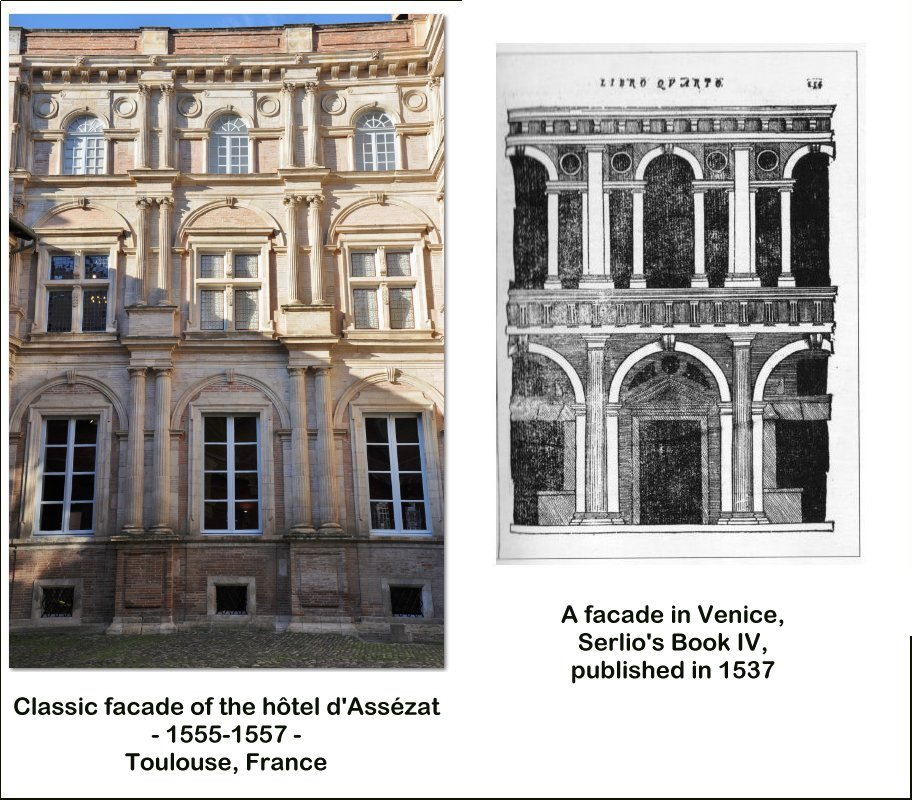
Influence on hôtel d'Assézat's facades.

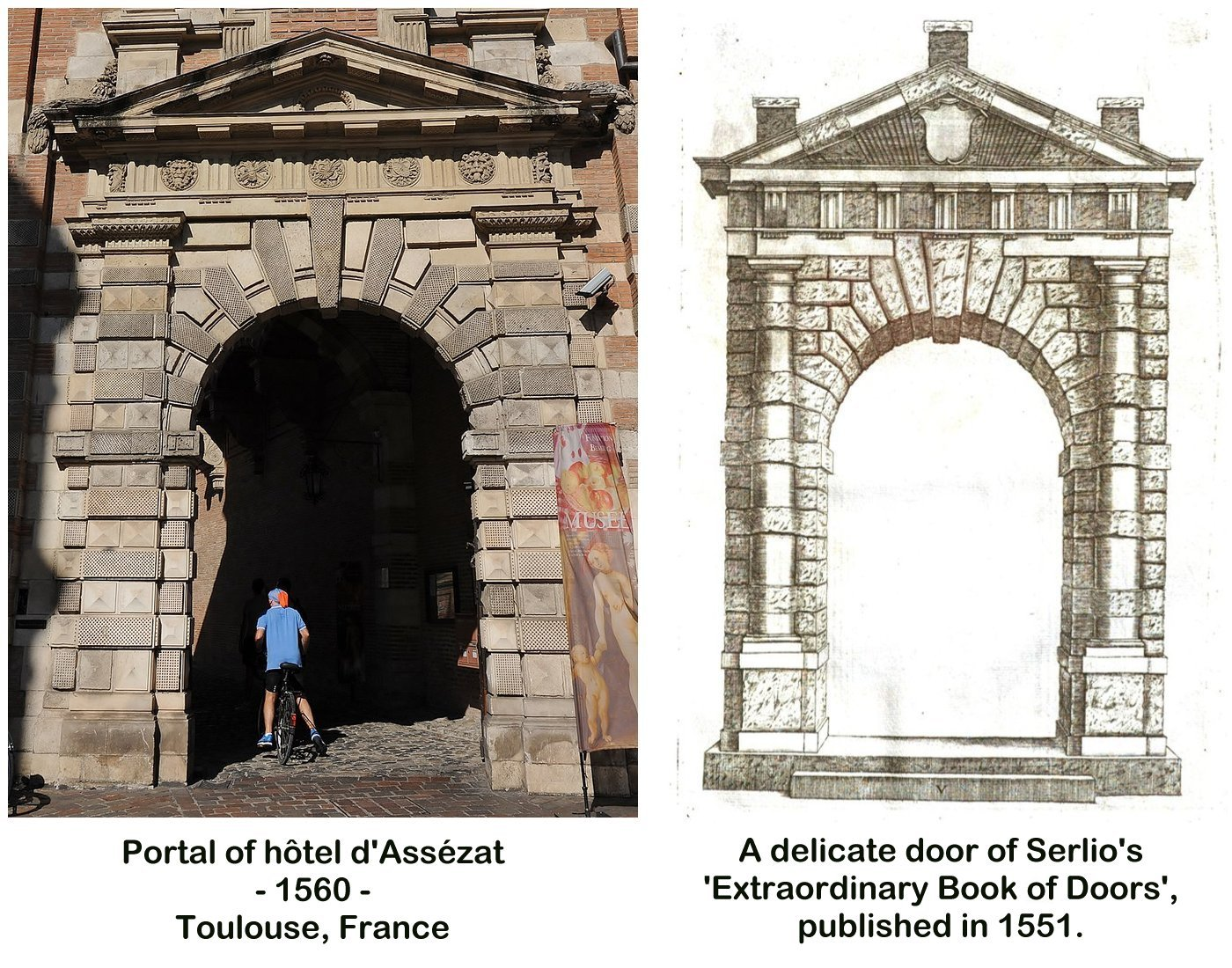
Influence on hôtel d'Assézat's portal.

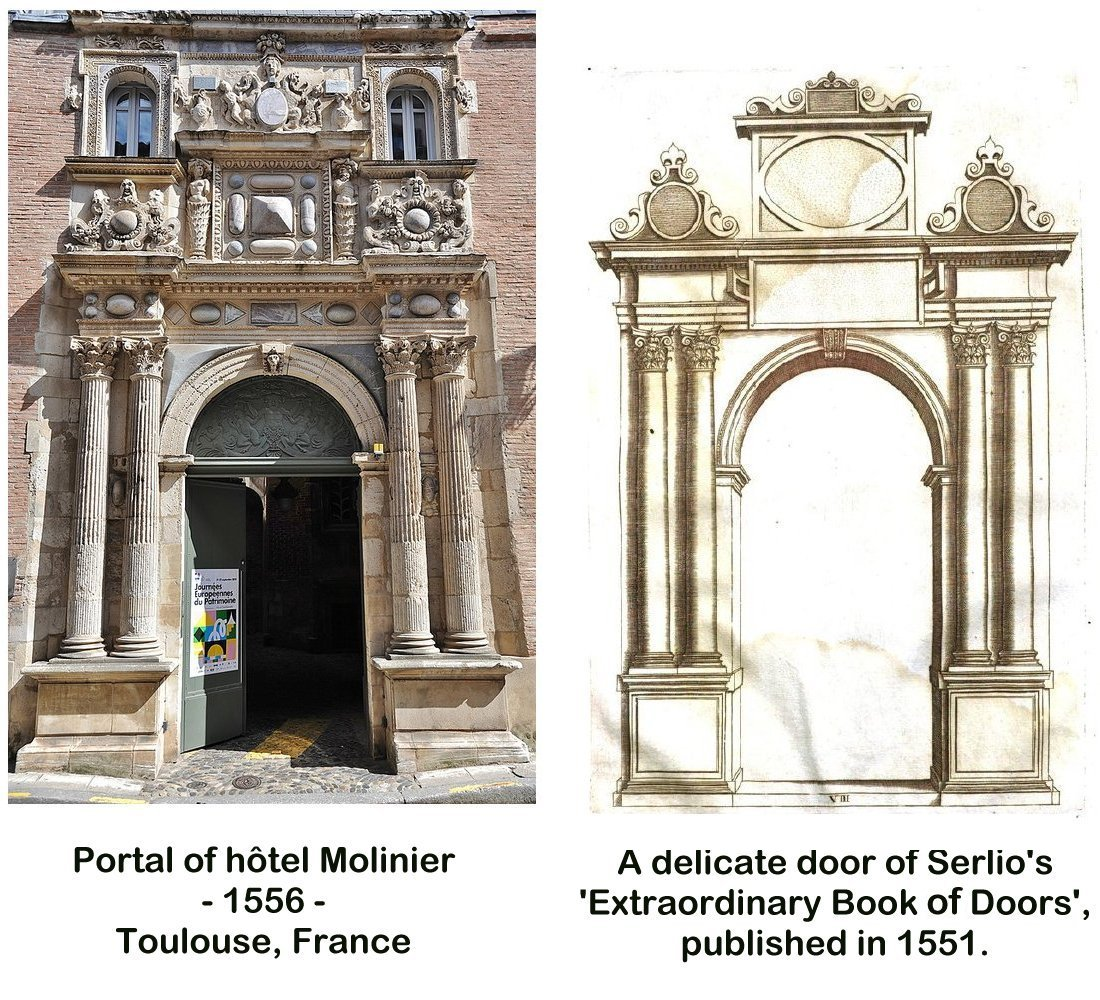
Influence on hôtel Molinier's portal.

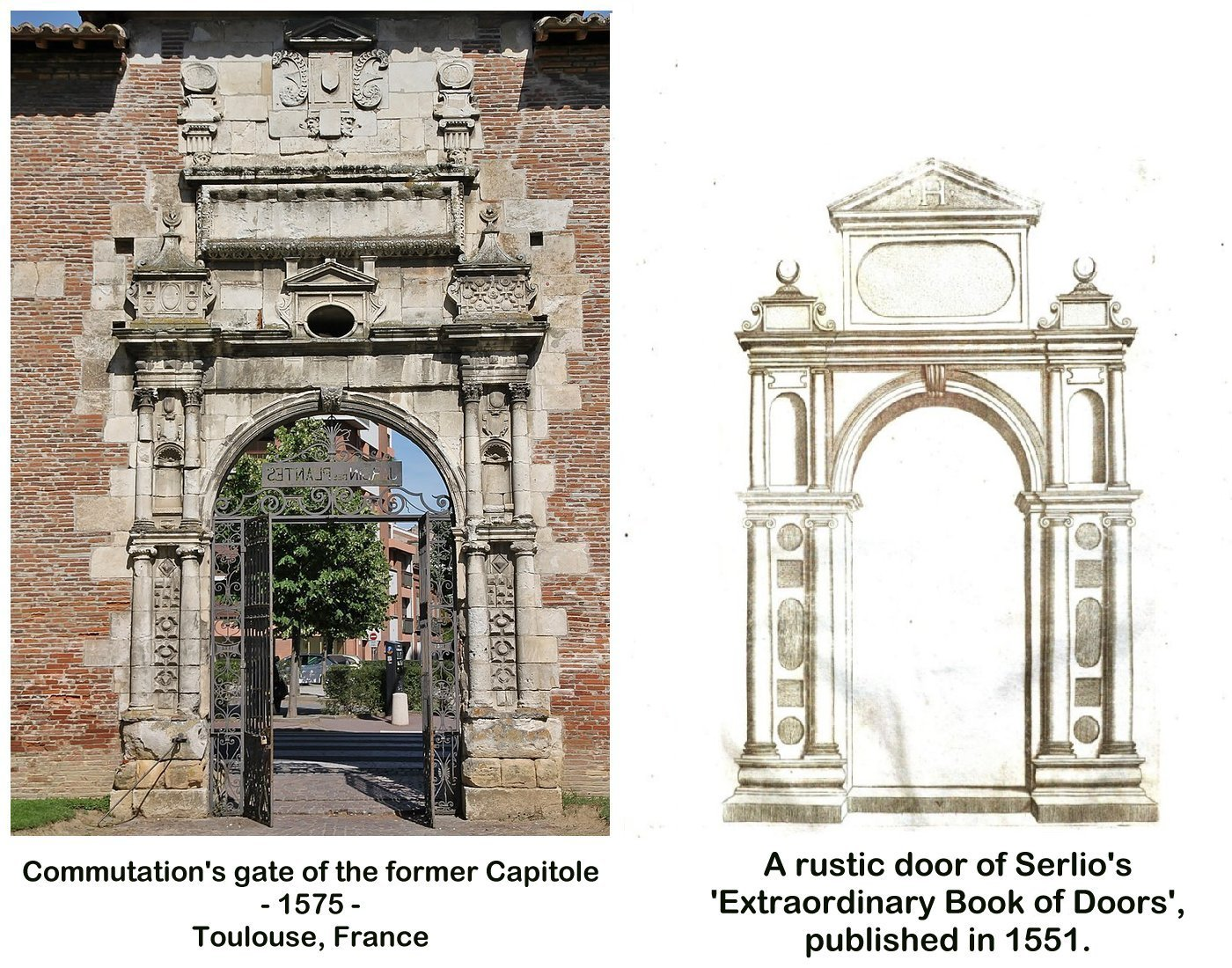
Influence on a former gate of Toulouse Capitole.

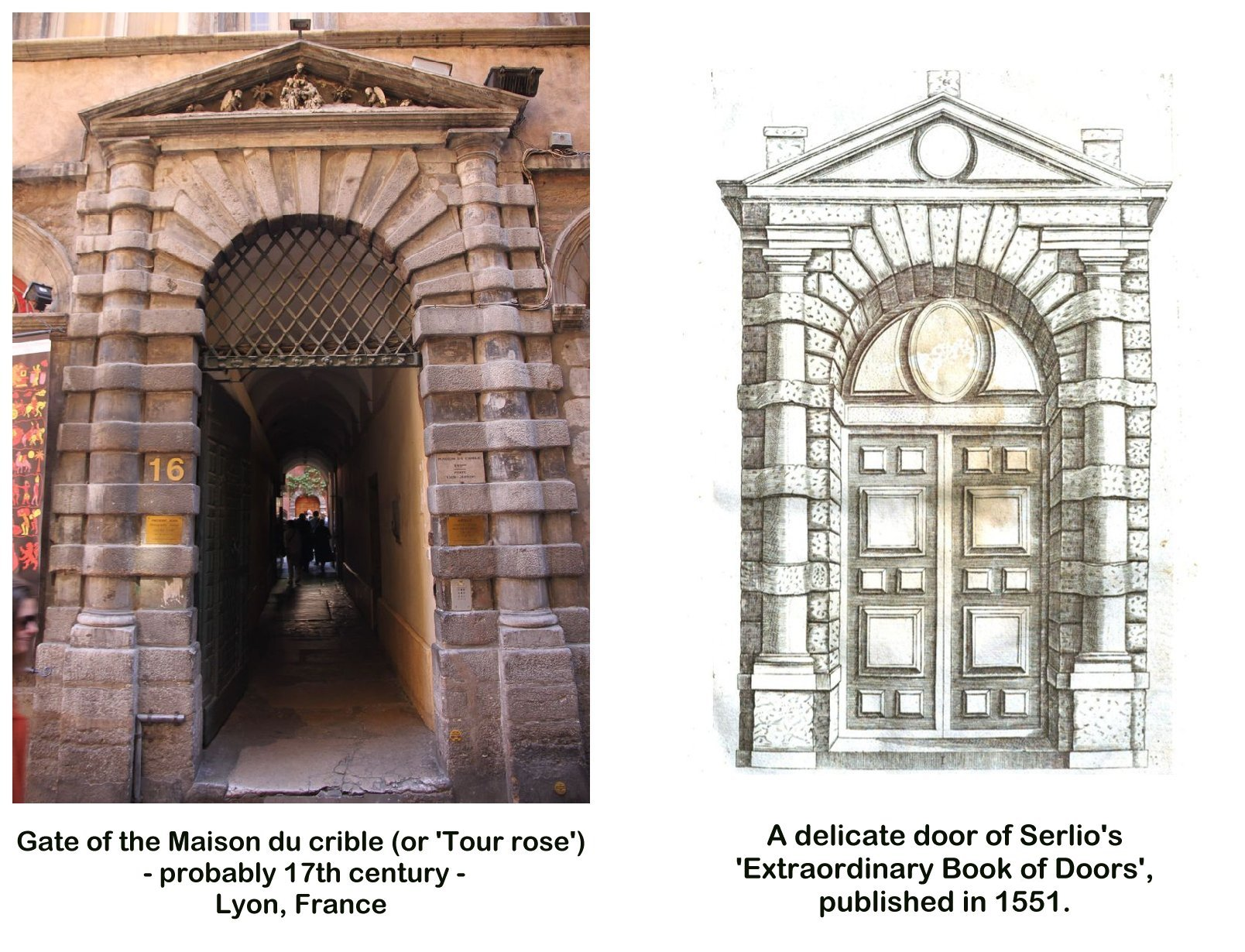
Influence on Maison du Crible's gate.

== Notes ==
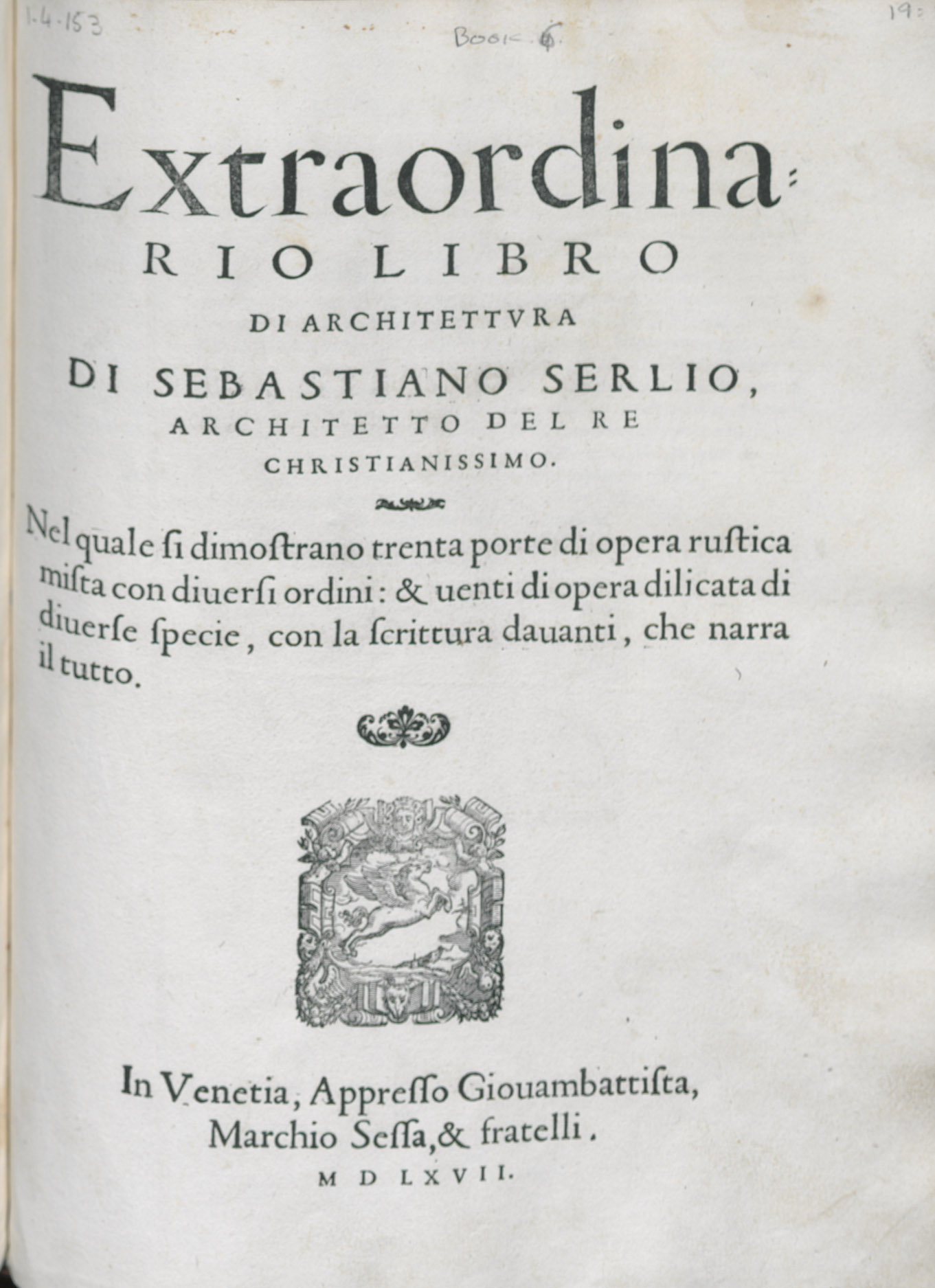
Extraordinario libro di architettura, 1567
