= Pope Marcellus II =

Head of the Catholic Church in 1555

- Bishop of Rome
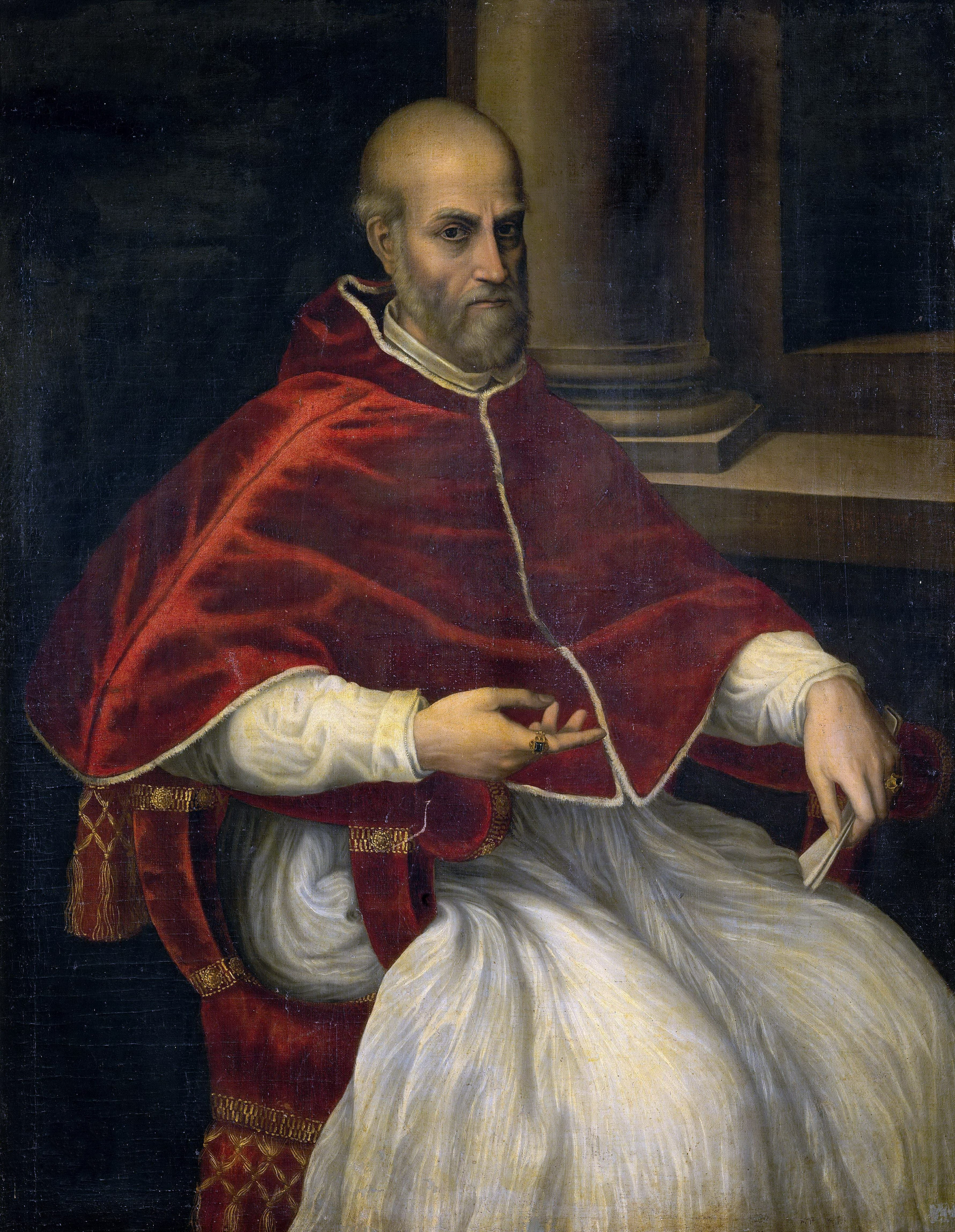
- Portrait by an anonymous artist, 16th-century, Vatican Museums
- Church: Catholic Church
- Papacy began: 10 April 1555
- Papacy ended: 1 May 1555
- Predecessor: Julius III
- Successor: Paul IV
- Previous posts: Administrator of Nicastro (1539–1540); Bishop of Reggio Emilia (1540–1544); Cardinal-Priest of Santa Croce in Gerusalemme (1540–1555); Bishop of Gubbio (1544–1555); Chief of the Vatican Library (1550–1555)

Orders
- Ordination: 1535
- Consecration: 10 April 1555 by Gian Pietro Carafa
- Created cardinal: 19 December 1539 by Paul III

Personal details
- Born: Marcello Cervini degli Spannocchi; 6 May 1501 Montefano, Marche, Papal States
- Died: 1 May 1555 (aged 53) Rome, Papal States
- Signature: Marcellus II's signature

- Coat of arms: Marcellus II's coat of arms

Papal styles of Pope Marcellus II
- Reference style: His Holiness
- Spoken style: Your Holiness
- Religious style: Holy Father
- Posthumous style: None

Pope Marcellus II (Italian: Marcello II; 6 May 1501 – 1 May 1555), born Marcello Cervini degli Spannocchi, was head of the Catholic Church and leader of the Papal States from 10 April 1555 to his death, 22 days later.

Marcellus succeeded Pope Julius III. Before his accession as pope he had been Cardinal-Priest of Santa Croce in Gerusalemme. He is the most recent pope to choose to retain his birth name as his regnal name upon his accession, and the most recent pope with the regnal name "Marcellus".

Marcello Cervini's father, Ricardo Cervini, was a personal friend of Pope Clement VII. Cervini served in the household of Cardinal Alessandro Farnese. When Farnese became Pope Paul III, Cervini served as his secretary and was employed on a number of diplomatic missions. On 10 April 1555, he was elected to succeed Pope Julius III. He died of a stroke twenty-two days later.

== Early life ==
Arms of the Cervini family

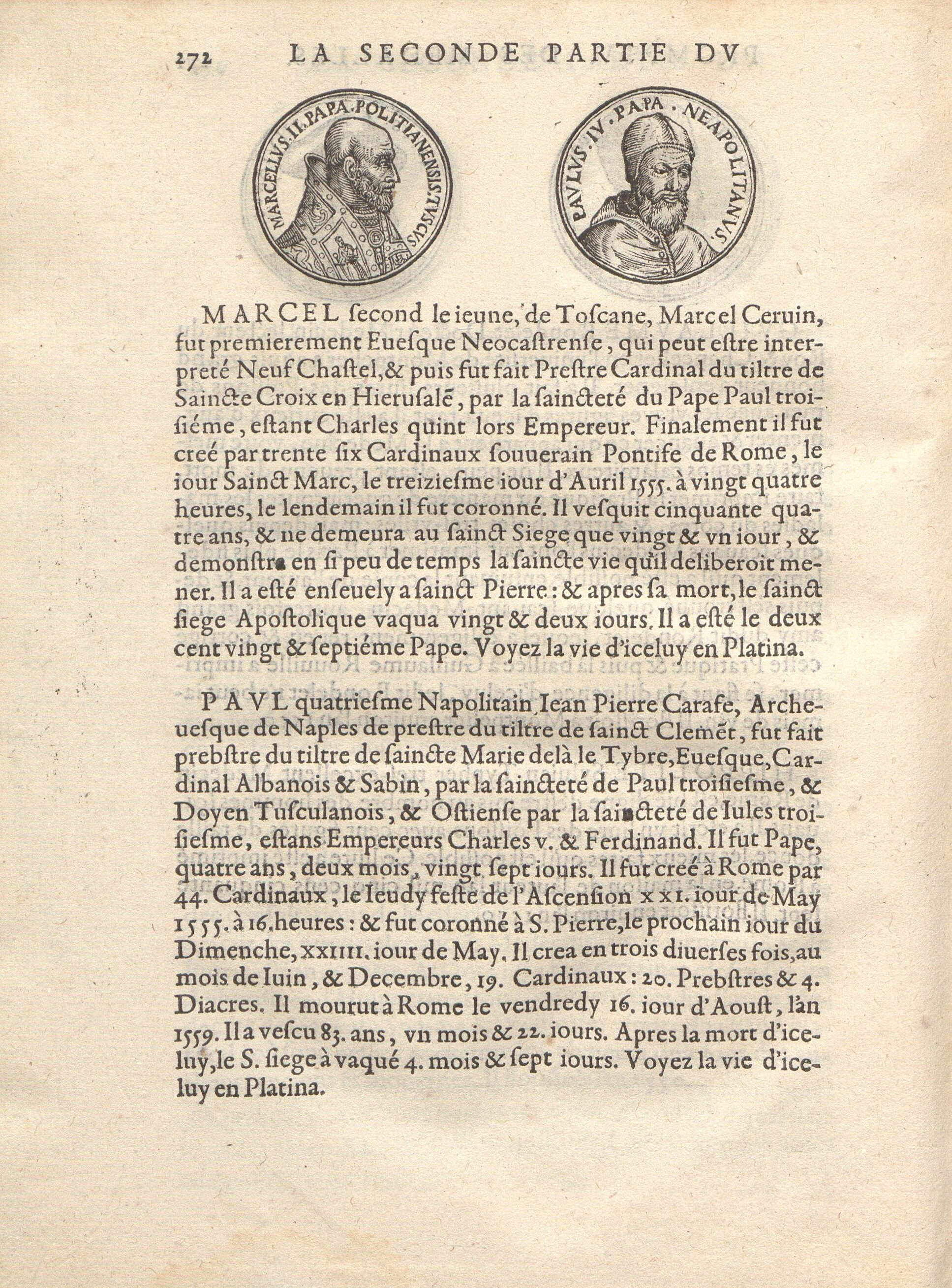
Pope Marcellus and his successor Pope Paul IV depicted in the 1581 edition of Seconde partie dv promptvaire des medalles by Guillaume Rouillé

A native of Montefano, a small village near Macerata and Loreto he was the son of Ricardo Cervini who was the Apostolic Treasurer in Ancona. The family originated in Tuscany, in the town of Montepulciano, which had once been subject to Siena, but later was under the control of Florence. Marcello had two half-brothers, Alexander and Romulus.

Marcello was educated locally, and at Siena and Florence, where he became proficient in writing Latin, Greek, and Italian. He also received instruction in jurisprudence, philosophy, and mathematics. His father had an interest in astrology and upon discovering that his son's horoscope presaged high ecclesiastical honours, Riccardo set the young Cervini on a path to the priesthood.

== Priesthood ==
After his period of study at Siena, Cervini traveled to Rome in the company of the delegation sent by Florence to congratulate the new Pope on his election. His father and Pope Clement VII were personal friends, and Marcello was made Scrittore Apostolico. He was set to work on astronomical and calendar studies, a project which was intended to bring the year back into synchronization with the seasons. In 1527, he fled home after the Sack of Rome, but eventually returned and was taken into the household of Cardinal Alessandro Farnese senior. Cervini was ordained a priest in 1535.

== Cardinalate ==
In 1534, after Farnese had become Pope Paul III, Cervini was appointed a papal secretary (1534–49) and served as a close advisor to the pope's nephew Alessandro Farnese. He was made a papal protonotary. He travelled in the suite of the Pope during the papal visit to Nice, where Paul III was promoting a truce between Francis I and Charles V. He then accompanied the young Cardinal Farnese on a journey to Spain, France and the Habsburg Netherlands to help implement the terms of the truce. Paul III later appointed him Bishop of Nicastro in 1539. Cervini was not, however, consecrated bishop until the day he himself was elected pope. On 19 December 1539, while Cervini was still on the embassy to the Netherlands, Paul III created him Cardinal-Priest of Santa Croce in Gerusalemme.

When, almost immediately afterwards, Cardinal Farnese was recalled to Rome, Cervini stayed on in Spain as nuncio. Over the course of the next decade Cervini also became the apostolic administrator of the dioceses of Reggio and Gubbio. His house in Rome became a center of Renaissance culture, and he himself corresponded with most of the leading humanists. In 1542 the Accademia della Virtù was formed in Rome under his patronage to prepare a new annotated edition of Vitruvius's De architectura (he owned four manuscript copies). They met twice a week to read and discuss Vitruvius in the context of ancient monuments.

During the Council of Trent he was elected one of the council's three presidents, along with fellow cardinals Reginald Pole and Giovanni Maria Ciocchi del Monte (the future Pope Julius III). He continued to serve in that role throughout the remainder of Paul III's papacy, after which he was replaced to placate the Holy Roman Emperor Charles V (1519–56). He was credited with defending not only orthodoxy and Church discipline, but also the universal claims of the Papacy in spiritual and temporal affairs, and with such vigor that the Emperor was affronted. In 1548 (or 1550) Cervini was placed in charge of the Vatican Library, with the title of Protettore della Biblioteca Apostolica. The institutionalization of the printers of the Curia under Cervini is explored by Paolo Sachet in Publishing for the Popes: The Roman Curia and the Use of Printing (1527-1555). The Apostolic Brief of his appointment, however, came from the new pope, Julius III, on 24 May 1550, and in it he was named not Vatican Librarian, but Bibliothecarius Sanctae Romanae Ecclesiae because he was the first cardinal to be placed in charge of the library. During his administration, he employed the services of Guglielmo Sirleto, as well as Onofrio Panvinio (who was especially consulted in matters of Christian archaeology). He added more than 500 codices to the holdings of the Library, including 143 Greek codices, as his own entry book (which still survives as Vaticanus Latinus 3963) testifies.

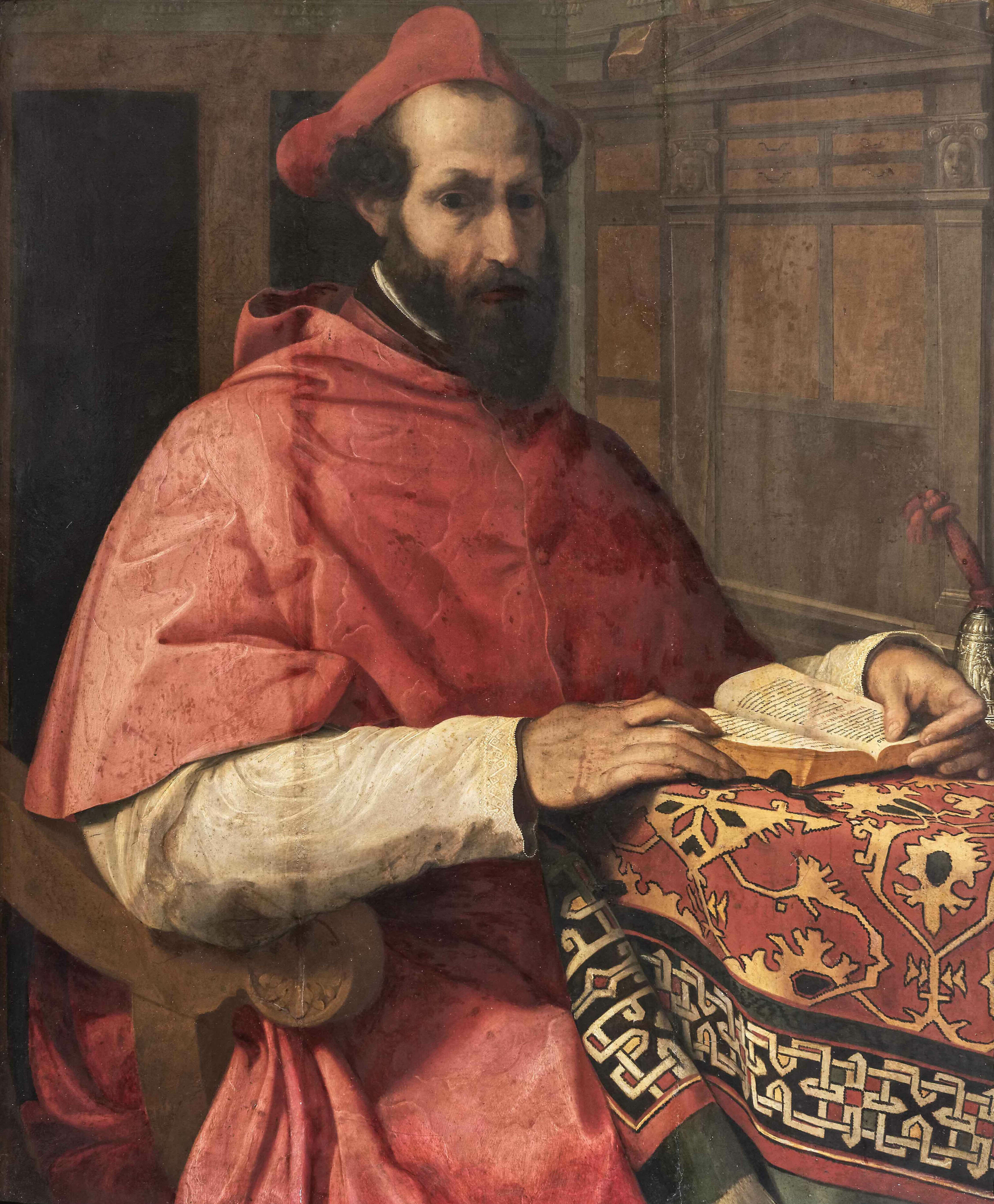
Portrait of Cardinal Cervini by Jacopino del Conte, c. 1550

In the conclave of 1549–50 held to elect a successor to Paul III, fifty-one cardinals, including Marcello Cervini, participated at the opening on 3 December 1549. The initial candidates included Cardinals Reginald Pole, Francesco Sfondrati, Rodolfo Pio da Carpi and Niccolò Ridolfi (who died on the night of 31 January). Pole, the favorite of the Emperor Charles V, came within two votes of being elected in the first scrutinies, but he failed to attract any additional votes. Juan Álvarez de Toledo, Bishop of Burgos, another Imperial favorite, was proposed, and he too failed, because of strong opposition from the faction of Cardinal Alessandro Farnese, nephew of the late Pope Paul III and from the French.

On 12 December, five more French cardinals arrived, and though they could not advance the candidacy of their favorite, Ippolito d'Este, they did have Cardinal Cervini on their list of possible candidates. Farnese and his faction were also favorably disposed to him. Unfortunately, the Imperial faction was not. Worst of all, on 22 December, Cardinal Cervini left the Conclave, suffering from a quartan fever. Finally, on 7 February 1550, the cardinals chose Giovanni Maria Ciocchi del Monte, who took the name Julius III.

== Papal election ==
The first conclave of 1555, following the death of Julius III (1550–55), involved a struggle between French interests in Italy (which had been favored by Julius III) and Imperial interests, which were intent on Church reform through a Church council, but with the Emperor controlling the outcome. On 9 April 1555, on the evening of the fourth day of the papal conclave, Cervini was "adored" as pope, despite efforts by cardinals loyal to Emperor Charles V to block his election. Next morning, a formal vote was taken in the Capella Paolina, in which all of the votes cast were for Cardinal Cervini except his own, which he cast for the Dean of the College of Cardinals, Gian Pietro Carafa.

The new pope chose to retain his birth name, the most recent pope to do so, reigning as Marcellus II. He was both consecrated as a bishop and crowned pope on the next day in a ceremony that was subdued on account of it falling during the Lenten season.

== Papacy ==
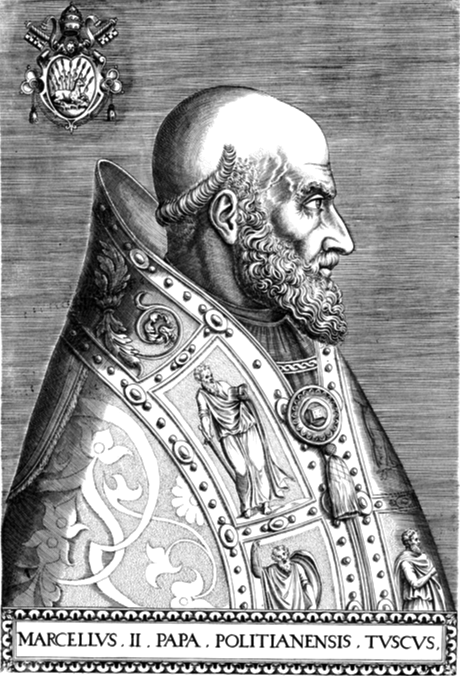
Marcellus II depicted in an engraving by Philippe Soye after Onofrio Panvinio, published in 1568 by Antonio Lafreri

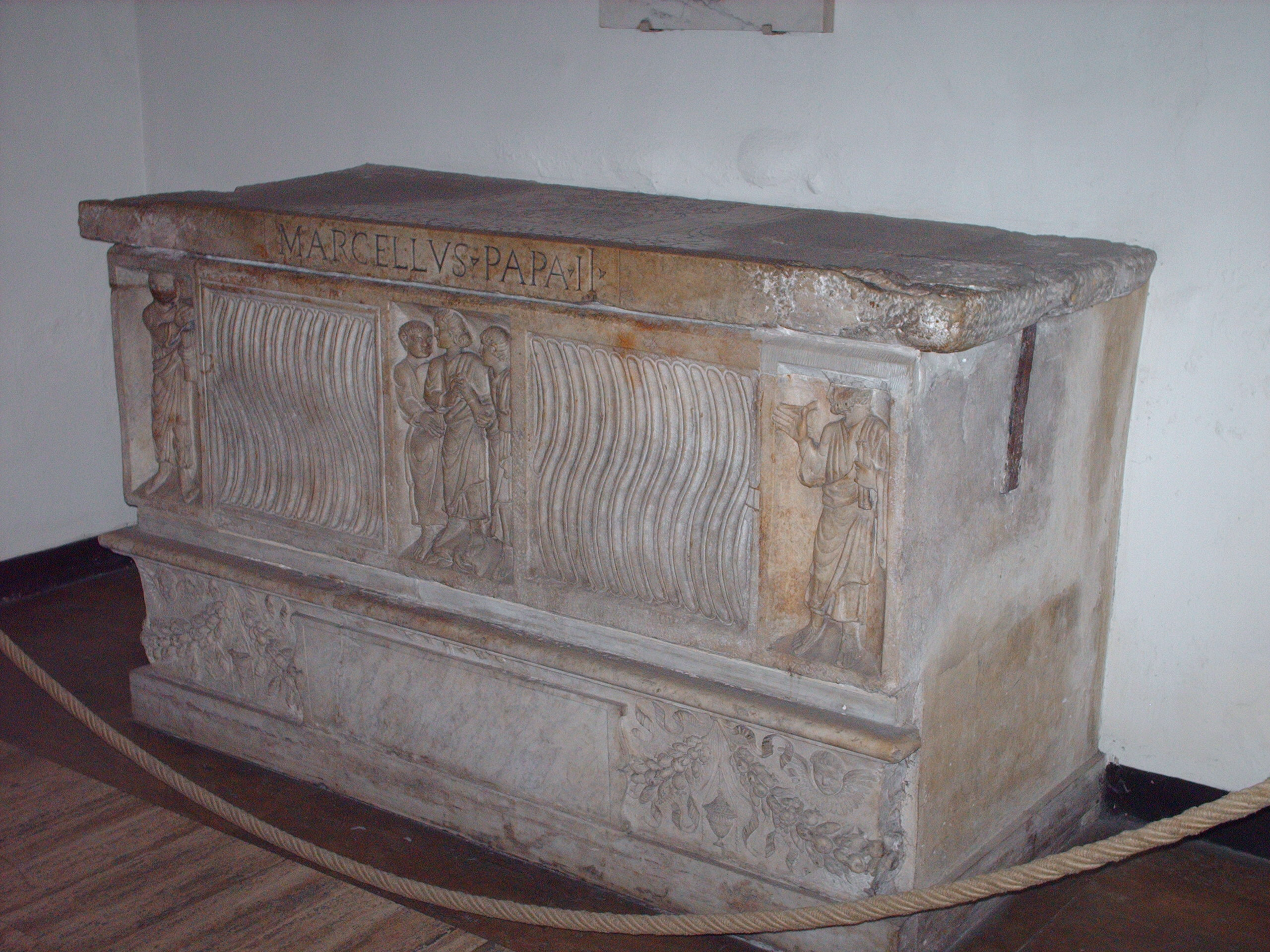
The tomb of Pope Marcellus II in the grottoes of St. Peter's Basilica in Vatican City

Though Marcellus II desired to reform many of the inner workings of the Church, his feeble constitution succumbed to the fatigues of the conclave, the exhausting ceremonies connected with his accession, the anxieties arising from his high office, and overexertion in his performance of the pontifical functions of the Holy Week and Easter. He quickly fell ill.

He was bled, and appeared to begin to recover. In an audience he gave to the cardinals, who wanted him to sign the Electoral Capitulations from the conclave and to guarantee that he would make no more cardinals than those agreements allowed, he refused to sign, stating that he would show his intent by deeds not words. In his first audience with the ambassadors of France and Spain, he warned the ambassadors that their monarchs should keep the peace that had been agreed upon, and that if they did not, not only would they be sent nuncios and legates, but that the pope himself would come and admonish them. He wrote letters to Emperor Charles V, to Queen Mary I of England, and to Cardinal Reginald Pole (in which he confirmed Pole as legate in England). When the Spanish ambassador asked for pardon for having killed a man, Marcellus replied that he did not want to start his reign with such auspices as absolution from homicide, and ordered the appropriate tribunals to observe the law.

He did not want his relatives descending on Rome, nor did he want them to be enriched beyond the station of a member of the nobility, and he did not allow his two nephews, Riccardo and Herennius (sons of his half-brother Alexander), who lived in Rome under his care, to have formal visits. He instituted immediate economies in the expenditure of the Holy See. On 28 April, he was able to receive Duke Guidobaldo II della Rovere of Urbino in audience, and on 29 April, Ercole II d'Este, duke of Ferrara. He also gave audience to four cardinals, Farnese, D'Este, Louis de Guise and Ascanio Sforza, the leaders of the French faction in the recent conclave. That night he had difficulty sleeping. On the morning of the 30th he suffered a stroke (hora XII apoplexi correptus) and slipped into a coma. That night he died, on the 22nd day after his election.

== Legacy ==
Palestrina's Missa Papae Marcelli (dating from 1565 or before), one of the glories of polyphonic sacred choral music, is traditionally believed to have been composed in his memory, ca. 1562. Having reigned for just 22 calendar days, Pope Marcellus II ranks sixth on the list of 10 shortest-reigning popes. His successor was Gian Pietro Carafa, Dean of the Sacred College of Cardinals, who reigned as Pope Paul IV (1555–59).

== See also ==
- List of popes

Catholic Church titles
Preceded by Julius III	Pope; 9 April – 1 May 1555	Succeeded by Paul IV
