= Altieri family =

Noble family

Altieri
- Black noble family
- Coat of Arms of the house of Altieri
- Country: Papal States; Republic of Genoa; Republic of Venice; Kingdom of Italy; Italy
- Founded: 14th century
- Founder: Corraduccio de Mastronis
- Final head: Ludovico Altieri, IX principe di Oriolo
- Titles: List of titles: Pope (non-hereditary); Cardinal (non-hereditary); Prince of Oriolo; Prince of Viano; Prince of Rasina; Duke of Monterano; Noble of Ancona; Patrizio Genovese; Patrizio Veneziano
- Motto: Tanto Alto Quanto Se Puote (As high as possible)
- Dissolution: June 6, 1955

The House of Altieri constitutes an ancient noble family of Rome, present in the history of the city since the Middle Ages. In addition to the title of Prince granted by the Pontiffs, branches of the Altieri were also part of the aristocracy of Genoa and of Venice. The family consolidated its position in the ranks of the great senatorial and cardinal aristocracy thanks to dynastic marriages with families like the Colonna, Paluzzi, Chigi, Odescalchi, Doria-Pamphili, Ruspoli, Barberini, Borghese and in more recent times the di Napoli Rampolla, relatives of the famous Cardinal Mariano Rampolla del Tindaro, Secretary of State of Pope Leo XIII, not to mention a multitude of princely families of Europe. Their fiefs consisted of the principality of Oriolo Romano and Vejano and the duchy of Monterano in the Alto Lazio. The Altieri were among the protagonists of the history of the city from the earlier Middle Ages until the second half of the twentieth century, reaching the apogee of their power with Emilio Bonaventura Altieri, elected pope in 1670 under the name of Clement X. Among the cadet branches are the Altieri notaries, descended from ancient Roman juridical lineage, and the Riso di Colobria barons, of Sicilian descent.

== History ==
=== Origins ===
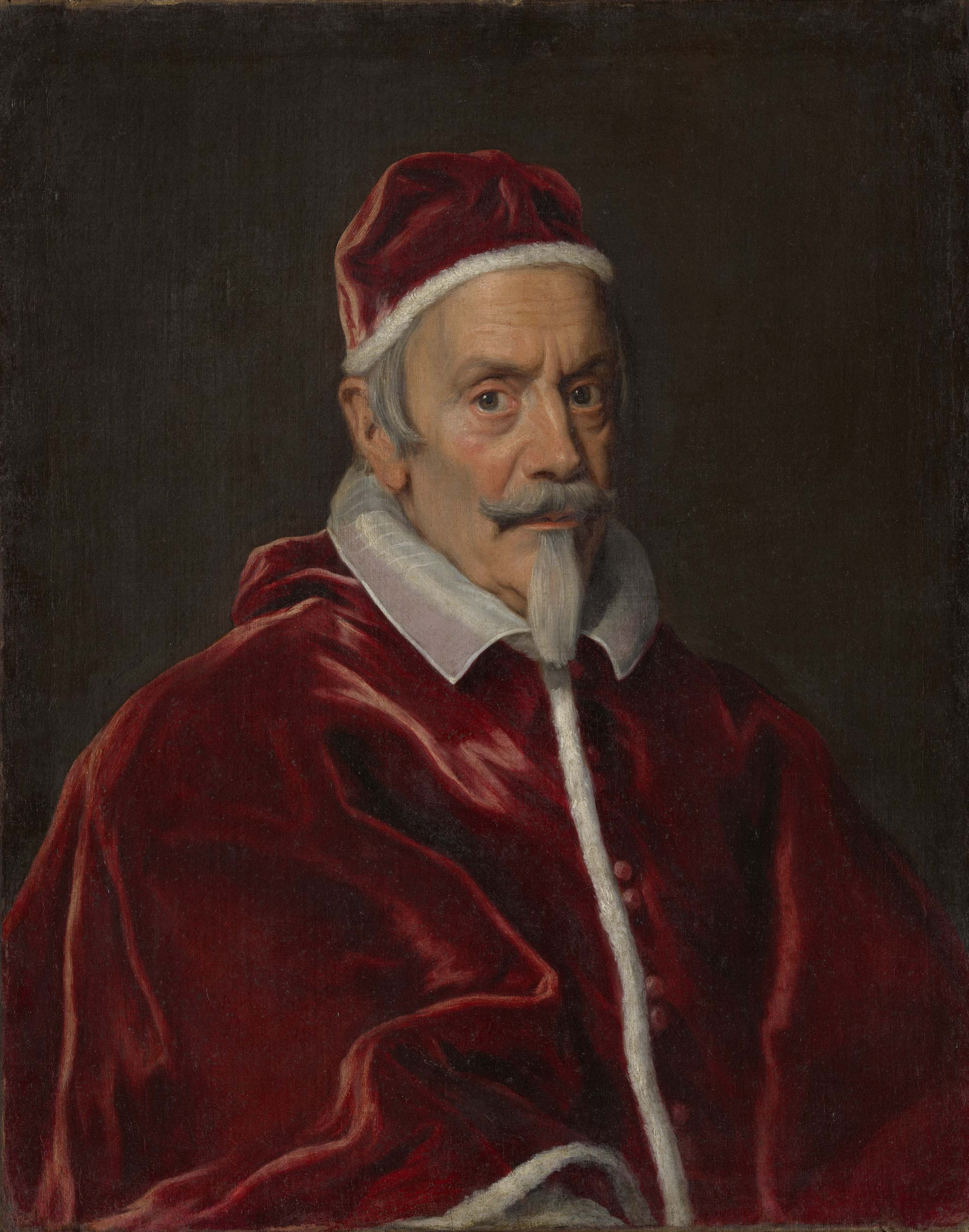
Portrait of Pope Clement X, born Emilio Bonaventura Altieri, by Giovanni Battista Gaulli, known as Il Baciccia

The Altieri family, according to a custom quite common in the past among the Roman nobility, claimed to descend from a Lucius Alterius, the legendary founder of the Roman Gens Alteria: to demonstrate that, the Altieri were in possession of an ancient funerary urn bearing his name. According to the Renaissance humanist Marco Antonio Altieri, a member of the family, as expressed in his work Li Nuptiali (the Libro d'Oro of 16th-century Roman nobility), the family's origins dated back to the gens Hostilia, which perpetuated a lineage already present in the annals of King Romulus and was numbered among the gentes originarie (the original families of Rome) of Livy. According to him the ancient surname of the Altieri was Lucii, descendants from the king of Rome Tullus Hostilius. From this stock, among others, would have descended also the Mancini family, to which belonged Maria Mancini, lover of Louis XIV and niece of Cardinal Jules Mazarin. But the origins of the family name were likely Germanic. The name possibly came to southern Italy from northern France through the Normans. Etymologically, the name Altieri comes from the old German language, and is made of two words, the first being either alda ("old", "experienced") or audha ("riches", "power"), and the second haria ("to practise"): the meaning would be respectively "experienced person" or "person who works with richness", i.e. jeweler, goldsmith. Another possible etymological origin suggests that it is derived from the Italian word of Latin origin “altieri”, which means “proud” or “haughty.” This term may have originally been used as a nickname for someone who exhibited proud or haughty personality traits.

=== 15th–16th century ===
The Altieri in the Middle Ages did not belong to the high nobility, but in the second half of the 15th century, they were already owners of huge estates and large flocks of sheep in the campagna romana. Moreover, they held several offices in Rome's administration, as those of Caporione (chief of a Rione), Maestro delle Strade (road Master), and Conservatore (city counselor). The above-mentioned Marco Antonio Altieri (1450-1532), was a humanist belonging to Pomponio Leto's circle, literary in his tastes, a farmer and also a good politician, because in 1511 he arranged the so-called "Pax Romana" among the Roman barons, ending centuries of fights among the nobility. In his work Li nuptiali, he is a laudator temporis acti, nostalgically comparing the conservative Roman country gentleman of the 15th century, drawing his income from houses in the city and farms and flocks in the Campagna, with the cosmopolitan nobleman of the 16th century, often immigrated from other cities and active in trade and banking.

During the 16th century, notable exponents of the family were Antonio Rutilio Altieri, another humanist and rector of the University of Rome, and Mario Altieri, a gifted canonist, author of the treatise De Censuris ecclesiasticis, printed after his death.

=== 17th century and later ===
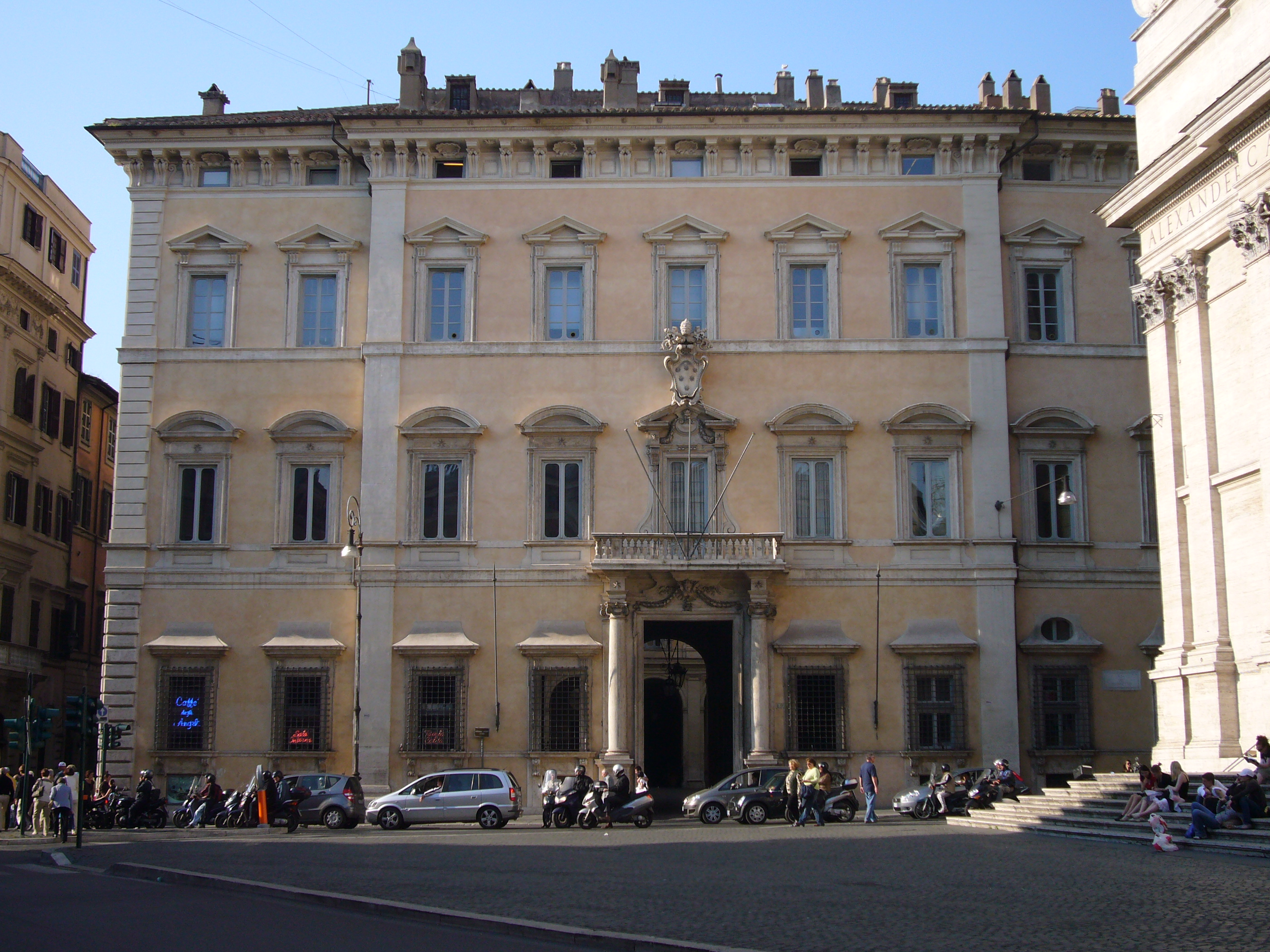
The Palazzo Altieri in Piazza del Gesù, Rome, commissioned by Giambattista Altieri and finished by Cardinal Paluzzo

Between the seventeenth and nineteenth centuries the family produced seven cardinals and reached its zenith with Emilio Bonaventura Altieri, born in 1590 to Lorenzo Altieri and his wife Vittoria Delfin, who belonged to one of the oldest families of the Venetian Republic, which gave to the republic of the Lion a doge, several procurators of St. Mark, many diplomats and also a host of cardinals.

Emilio Altieri, having taken vows, became bishop of Camerino in 1627, apostolic nuncius in Naples from 1644 to 1652: appointed cardinal in 1669 by Pope Clement IX, he ascended the papal throne in 1670 with the name of Clement X: he reigned until his death in 1676. But the moment of maximum splendor of the family also coincided with its extinction. Emilio Altieri, now Clement X, last male member of the family, on the occasion of the marriage between Marquis Gaspare Paluzzi Albertoni, belonging to the Paluzzi Albertoni, often related with the Altieri, and his niece Laura Caterina, ensured that the surname of his family, including property and coat of arms, would pass to the Paluzzi Albertoni, whose surname thus became "Paluzzi Altieri degli Albertoni".

The pope, considering that in his family the male element was now extinct, used every possible means to secure the Albertoni connection through this advantageous union, while convincing the father of Gaspare, Antonio Albertoni, and his uncle Paluzzo to change their surname to Altieri: this led to the extinction of the Albertoni family, which for centuries had been politically allied and intermarried with the Altieri. Thanks to the intervention of Clement X, Gaspare became Prince of Oriolo and Viano (Vejano) and Duke of Monterano. Paluzzo, created cardinal, became the pope's cardinal-nephew, ruling de facto the catholic Church as Cardinal-padrone (English: Cardinal-master), and making of his family one of the richest of the city.

The Altieri had other Cardinals: Giambattista the elder (1589-1654), brother of Emilio, who prepared the ascent to the papacy of his younger brother, and commissioned the family's palazzo in the rione Pigna, replacing the already existing Altieri houses; Lorenzo (1671 - 1741); Giambattista the younger (1673-1740); Vincenzo Maria (1724 - 1800) who became famous for his courageous resignation during the Jacobin Republic; then Lodovico (1805–67) who, after being nuncius at Vienna for several years, was part of the triumvirate of Cardinals which ruled Rome after the end of the Roman republic in 1849. Appointed Cardinal of Albano, he died of cholera in 1867, while assisting people hit by the epidemics.

The family became extinct in 1955, with the death of the last prince, Prince Ludovico Altieri (1878–1955). Nowadays, the descendants of a cadet branch of the family have survived. The founder of the family was Ferdinando Altieri (1887-1966), great invalid of war, veteran of the first world conflict and husband of Irene Riso (1888-1984), scion of the Riso di Colobria barons based in Palermo. The couple had three children, including Alberto Altieri (1929 - 2012) spiritual son of cardinal Sergio Pignedoli as well as an official and director of the photografiphic archive of RAI. The aforesaid branch, even though it is distantly linked to the main dynasty, does not hold any noble property.

=== Chronology of the Princes of Oriolo and Viano ===
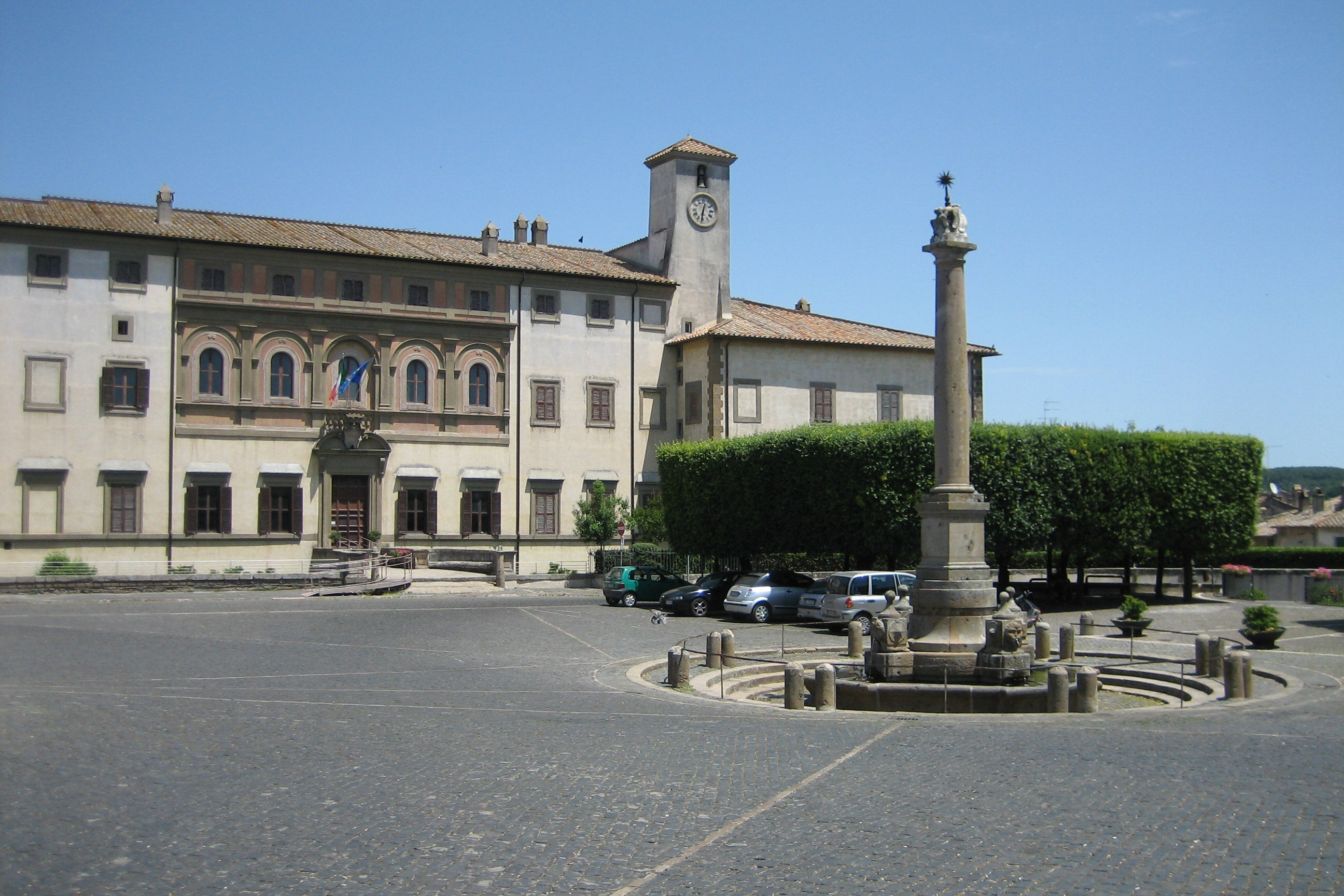
Palazzo Altieri at Oriolo Romano, the main fief of the family. In front of the palace can be noted a column bearing the Altieri coat of arms

Official Chronology of the nine princes:

- Gaspare Altieri, 1650–1720, 1st Prince of Oriolo and Viano
- Emilio Altieri, 1670–1721, 2nd Prince
- Girolamo Antonio Altieri, 1673–1762, 3rd Principe
- Carlo Emilio Altieri, 1723–1801, 4th Prince
- Paluzzo Altieri, 1760–1834, 5th Prince
- Clemente Altieri, 1795–1873, 6th Principe
- Emilio Altieri, 1819–1900, 7th Principe
- Paolo Altieri, 1849–1901, 8th Prince
- Ludovico Altieri, 1878–1955, 9th (and last) Prince

Ludovico, the last Prince, had the following brothers and sisters

- Teodolinda Altieri, 1876–1947
- Clemente Altieri, 1877–1886
- Maria Augusta Altieri, 1880–1976 (the last member of the princely family to bear the surname)
- Guglielmo Altieri, 1884–1893
- Marcantonio Altieri, 1886–1886
- Camilla Altieri, 1889–1971
- Marcantonio Altieri, 1891–1919

== See also ==
- Palazzo Altieri
- Paluzzo Paluzzi Altieri degli Albertoni
- Oriolo Romano
- Monterano
- Vejano
