= Canale Monterano =

- Comune
- Comune di Canale Monterano
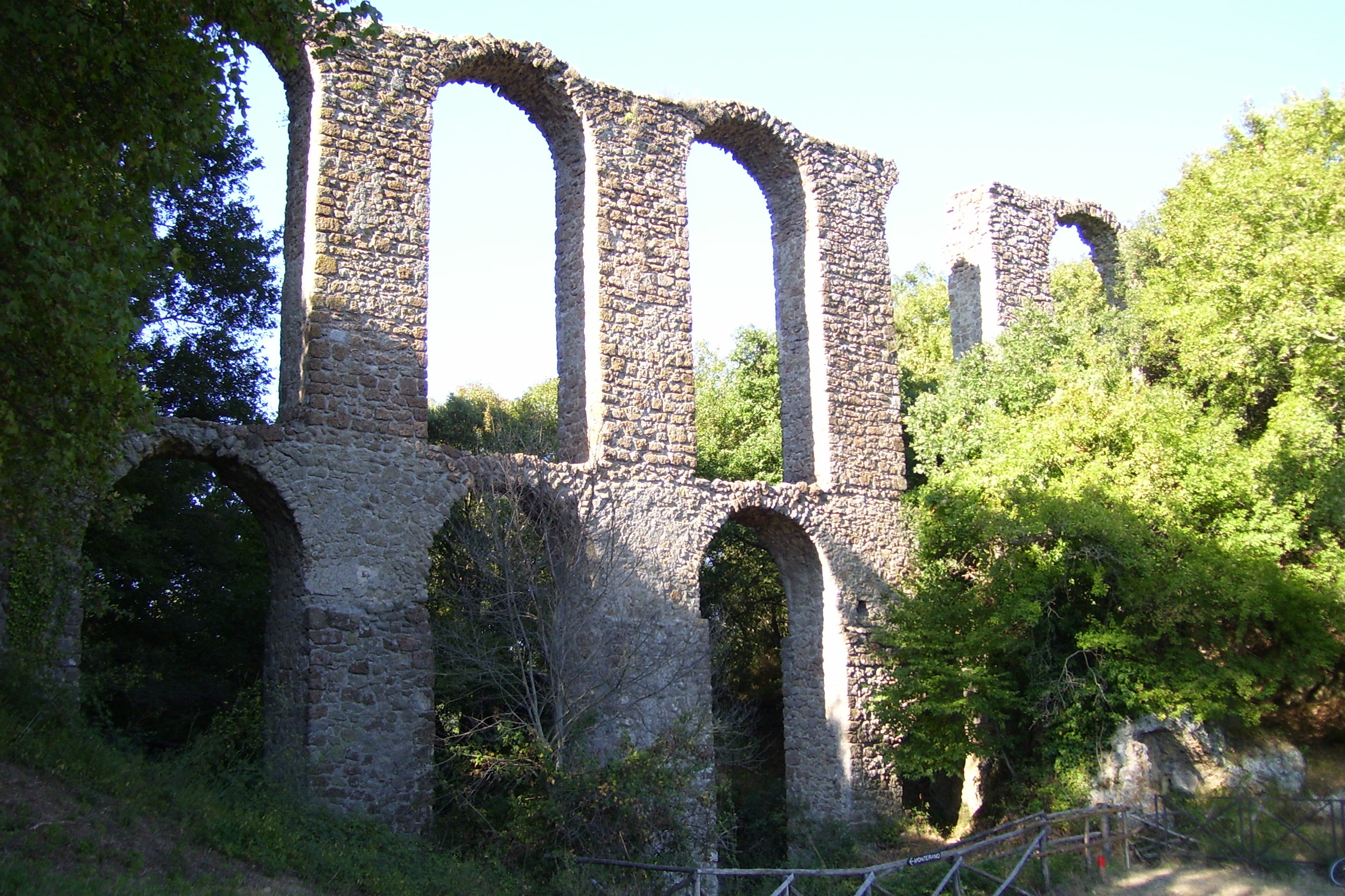
- 17th century aqueduct in Monterano.

- Coat of arms

- Location within Italy Location within Lazio
- Coordinates: 42°8′N 12°6′E
- Country: Italy
- Region: Lazio
- Metropolitan city: Rome (RM)
- Frazioni: La Piana, Montevirginio

Government
  - Mayor: Alessandro Bettarelli

Area
  - Total: 36.92 km^{2} (14.25 sq mi)
- Elevation: 378 m (1,240 ft)

Population (30 April 2017)
  - Total: 4,132
  - Density: 111.9/km^{2} (289.9/sq mi)
- Demonym: Canalesi
- Time zone: UTC+1 (CET)
  - Summer (DST): UTC+2 (CEST)
- Postal code: 00060
- Dialing code: 06
- Patron saint: St. Bartholomew
- Saint day: August 24
- Website: Official website

Canale Monterano is a comune (municipality), former bishopric and Latin titular see in the Metropolitan City of Rome, in the central Italian region of Lazio (Ancient Latium).

Canale Monterano, located about 40 kilometres (25 mi) northwest of Rome, borders the following municipalities : Blera, Manziana, Oriolo Romano, Tolfa and Vejano.

== Main sights ==
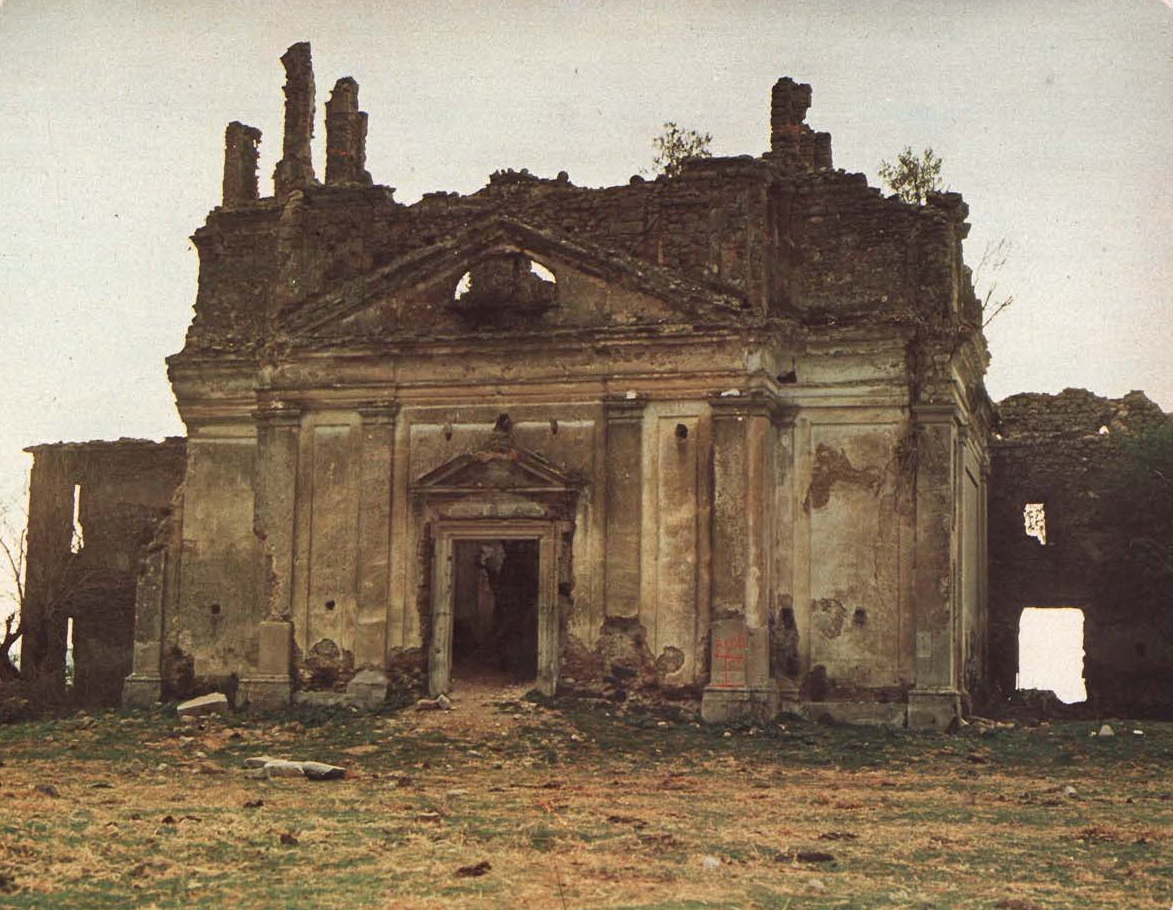
Ruins of the church of San Bonaventura, designed by Gian Lorenzo Bernini

- Giardini Botanici di Stigliano
- Ruins of the former village of Monterano, which was set on fire, together with its population, by the French Republican army at the end of the 18th century. It included the church of San Bonaventura and a Baroque fountain with a lion statue, both designed by Gian Lorenzo Bernini.
- Remains of Roman aqueduct
- Natural reserve of Monterano
- Hermitage of Montevirginio
