= Manziana =

- Comune
- Comune di Manziana
- Coat of arms

- Location within Italy Location within Lazio
- Coordinates: 42°8′N 12°8′E
- Country: Italy
- Region: Lazio
- Metropolitan city: Rome (RM)
- Frazioni: Quadroni

Government
  - Mayor: Bruno Bruni

Area
  - Total: 23.8 km^{2} (9.2 sq mi)
- Elevation: 369 m (1,211 ft)

Population (2009)
  - Total: 6,520
  - Density: 274/km^{2} (710/sq mi)
- Demonym: Manzianesi
- Time zone: UTC+1 (CET)
  - Summer (DST): UTC+2 (CEST)
- Postal code: 00066
- Dialing code: 06
- Patron saint: St. John the Baptist
- Saint day: 29 August
- Website: Official website

Manziana is a comune (municipality) in the Metropolitan City of Rome in the Italian region of Latium, located about 40 kilometres (25 mi) northwest of Rome.

Manziana borders the following municipalities: Bracciano, Canale Monterano, Oriolo Romano, Tolfa.
