= Vincenzo Maria Altieri =

Italian Roman Catholic cardinal

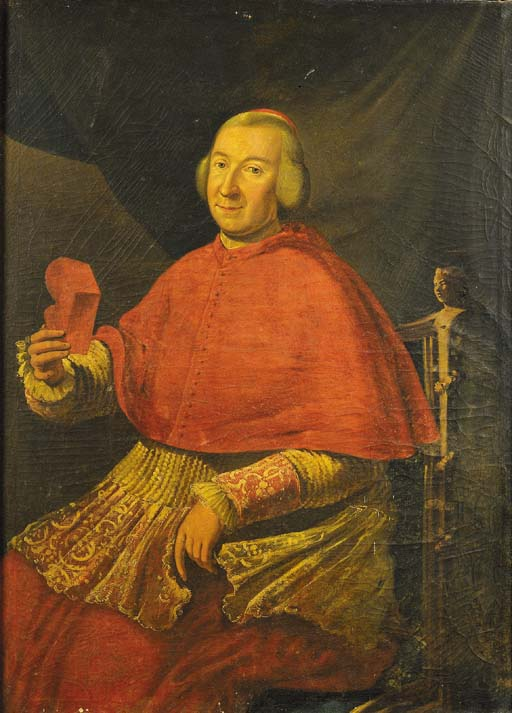
- Vincenzo Maria Altieri
- Born: 27 November 1724; Rome, Italy
- Died: 10 February 1800 (aged 75); Rome, Italy
- Occupation: Italian cardinal

Vincenzo Maria Altieri (1724–1800) was an Italian Roman Catholic cardinal from 1777 to 1800. He belonged to the Altieri family, one of the noble families of Rome.

== Biography ==
Vincenzo Maria Altieri was born in Rome on 27 November 1724, the son of Girolamo Altieri, prince of Oriolo, and Maria Maddalena Borromeo. Two of his father's brothers, Lorenzo Altieri and Giambattista Altieri were cardinals, while two of his nephews, Alessandro Mattei and Lorenzo Girolamo Mattei would also later become cardinals.

Altieri was made a protonotary apostolic on 3 October 1743, taking possession of that office on 24 August 1747, the same day he became a Referendary of the Apostolic Signatura. He served as prelate of the Sacred Congregation of the Council before being appointed vice-legate to Urbino in December 1755. On 11 November 1756, he was appointed vice-legate in Romagna, and in January 1758 became governor of Ancona. He was appointed to the Apostolic Camera in June 1764, returning to Rome and taking possession of that office in January 1765. He became president of Carceri at this time, then served as president of the Zecca from October 1765 to 1766. He was then president of Ripe from January 1767 through 1775. In April 1775, he returned to the Apostolic Camera in Rome. In May 1776, he became prefect of the papal household.

Pope Pius VI made Altieri a cardinal in pectore in the consistory of 23 June 1777. This was published in the consistory of 11 December 1780. Altieri received the red hat on 14 December 1780, and was awarded the deaconry of San Giorgio in Velabro. He was appointed to the Sacred Congregations of Bishops and Regulars, Council, Acque and Good Government. In January 1783, he became cardinal protector of the Clerics Regular Minor. On 23 April 1787, he opted for the deaconry of Sant'Angelo in Pescheria; then, on 10 March 1788, for the deaconry of Sant'Eustachio; then, on 12 September 1794, for the deaconry of Santa Maria in Via Lata. At this point, he became the cardinal protodeacon. On 29 January 1798, he became Camerlengo of the Sacred College of Cardinals.

In February 1798, Rome was invaded by troops of the French First Republic, who created the Roman Republic. Cardinal Altieri, who was by then gravely ill, was faced with the possibility of being imprisoned along with the other cardinals then in Rome. Rather than face the possibility of prison, Altieri resigned his cardinalate on 12 March 1798; Pope Pius VI reluctantly accepted his resignation on 7 September 1798.

Altieri died in Rome on 10 February 1800. He is buried in the Altieri family chapel in Santa Maria sopra Minerva.

Catholic Church titles
Preceded by Giulio Maria della Somaglia	Camerlengo of the Sacred College of Cardinals; 29 January 1798 – February 1798	Succeeded by Giulio Maria della Somaglia
