= Karl Bryullov =

Russian painter (1799–1852)

- Карл Брюллов
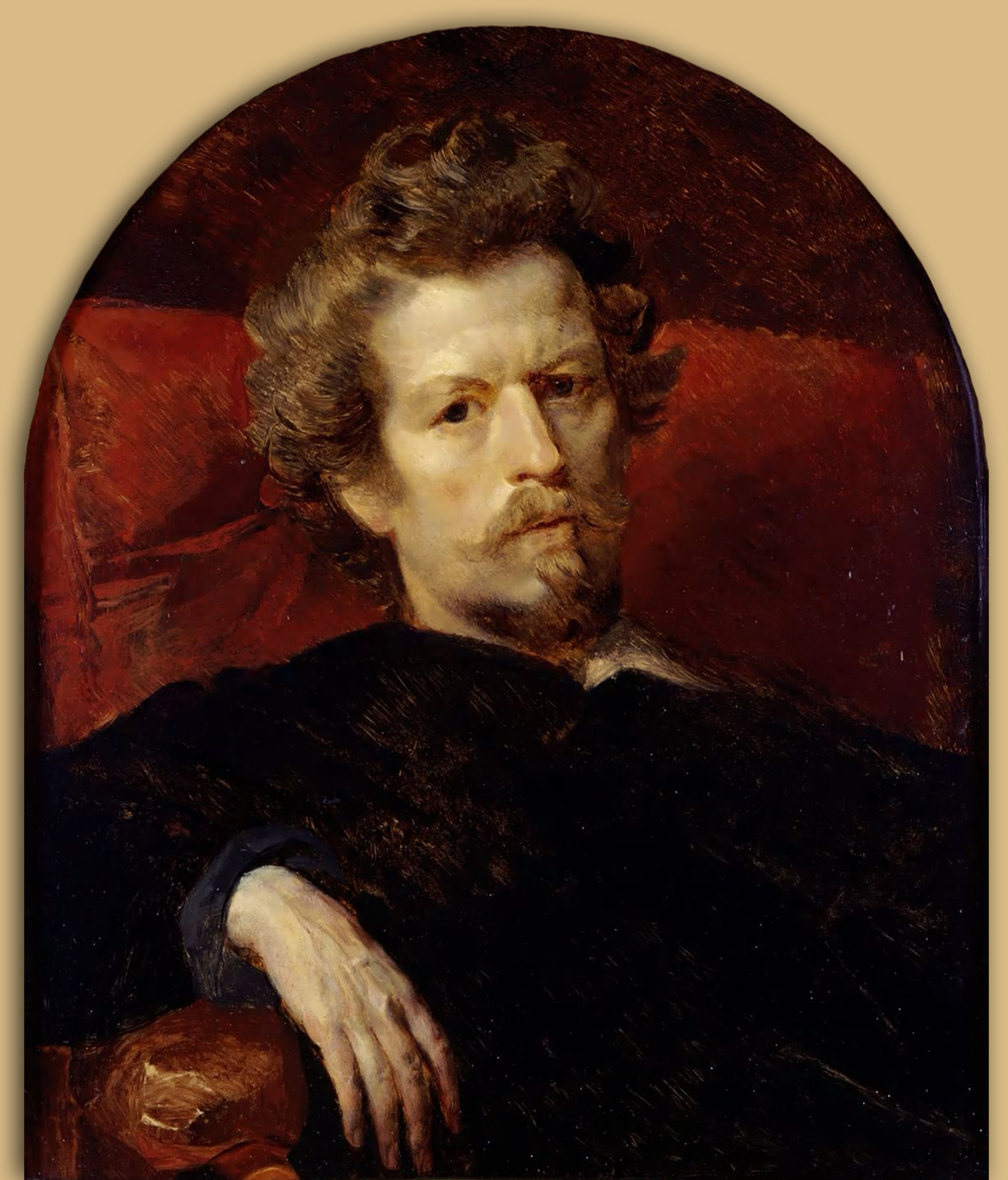
- Self-Portrait, 1848; Tretyakov Gallery, Moscow
- Born: Karl Pavlovich Brüllo; 12 December 1799; St. Petersburg, Russian Empire
- Died: 11 June 1852 (aged 52); Manziana near Rome, Papal States
- Resting place: Protestant Cemetery, Rome
- Education: Imperial Academy of Arts (1821)
- Known for: Painting and draughtsmanship
- Notable work: The Last Day of Pompeii, 1830–1833
- Movement: Romantic
- Spouse: Emilia Timm (m. 1839; div. 1839)
- Relatives: Alexander Bryullov (elder brother)
- Awards: Big Gold Medal of the Imperial Academy of Arts (1821)
- Elected: Professor by rank (1836)

Karl Pavlovich Bryullov (Note: Also spelled Brullov, Briullov or Briuloff.) (né Brüllo; Russian: Карл Па́влович Брюлло́в; 23 December [O.S. 12 December] 1799 – 23 June [O.S. 11 June] 1852) was a Russian painter and draughtsman during the Romantic period, remembered among the greatest visual artists in the history of Russian art.

== Biography ==
Karl Bryullov was born on 12 (23) December 1799 in St. Petersburg, in the family of the academician, woodcarver, and engraver Pavel Ivanovich Briullo (Brulleau, 1760—1833) who was of Huguenot descent. He felt drawn to Italy from his early years. Despite his education at the Imperial Academy of Arts (1809–1821), Bryullov never fully embraced the classical style taught by his mentors and promoted by his brother, Alexander Bryullov. After distinguishing himself as a promising and imaginative student and finishing his education, he left Russia for Rome where he worked until 1835 as a portraitist and genre painter, though his fame as an artist came when he began doing historical painting.

His best-known work, The Last Day of Pompeii (1830–1833), is a vast composition compared by Pushkin and Gogol to the best works of Rubens and Van Dyck. It created a sensation in Italy and established Bryullov as one of the finest European painters of his day. After completing this work, he triumphantly returned to the Russian capital, where he made many friends among the aristocracy and intellectual elite and obtained a high post in the Imperial Academy of Arts.

An anecdote concerning Bryullov appeared in Leo Tolstoy's essay "Why Do Men Stupefy Themselves?" and later in the same author's book What Is Art?.

While teaching at the academy (1836–1848) he developed a portrait style which combined a neoclassical simplicity with a romantic tendency that fused well, and his penchant for realism was satisfied with an intriguing level of psychological penetration. While he was working on the plafond of St Isaac's Cathedral, his health suddenly deteriorated. Following advice of his doctors, Bryullov left Russia for Madeira in 1849 and spent the last three years of his life in Italy. He died in the village of Manziana near Rome and is buried at the Cimitero Acattolico there.

== Characteristics of art ==
Bryullov's work is the pinnacle of late Russian Romanticism when the sense of harmonic wholeness and beauty of the world is replaced by a feeling of tragedy and conflict of life. In the forefront of the historical picture, but its main theme - not the struggle of heroes, as in classicism, and the fate of the huge human masses. In his central work "The Last Day of Pompeii" Bryullov combined the drama of action, romantic lighting effects and sculptural plasticity of figures. The painting brought the artist great fame both in Russia and in Europe.

An outstanding master of both ceremonial and chamber portraits, Bryullov evolved in his art from the joyful embrace of life in his early works to the intricate psychologism of his later ones, thus anticipating the achievements of such artists like Ilya Repin in the second half of the 19th century. Bryullov had an enormous influence on Russian artists, among whom he had many followers and imitators.

== Selected artwork ==
The Last Day of Pompeii, 1833, Russian Museum

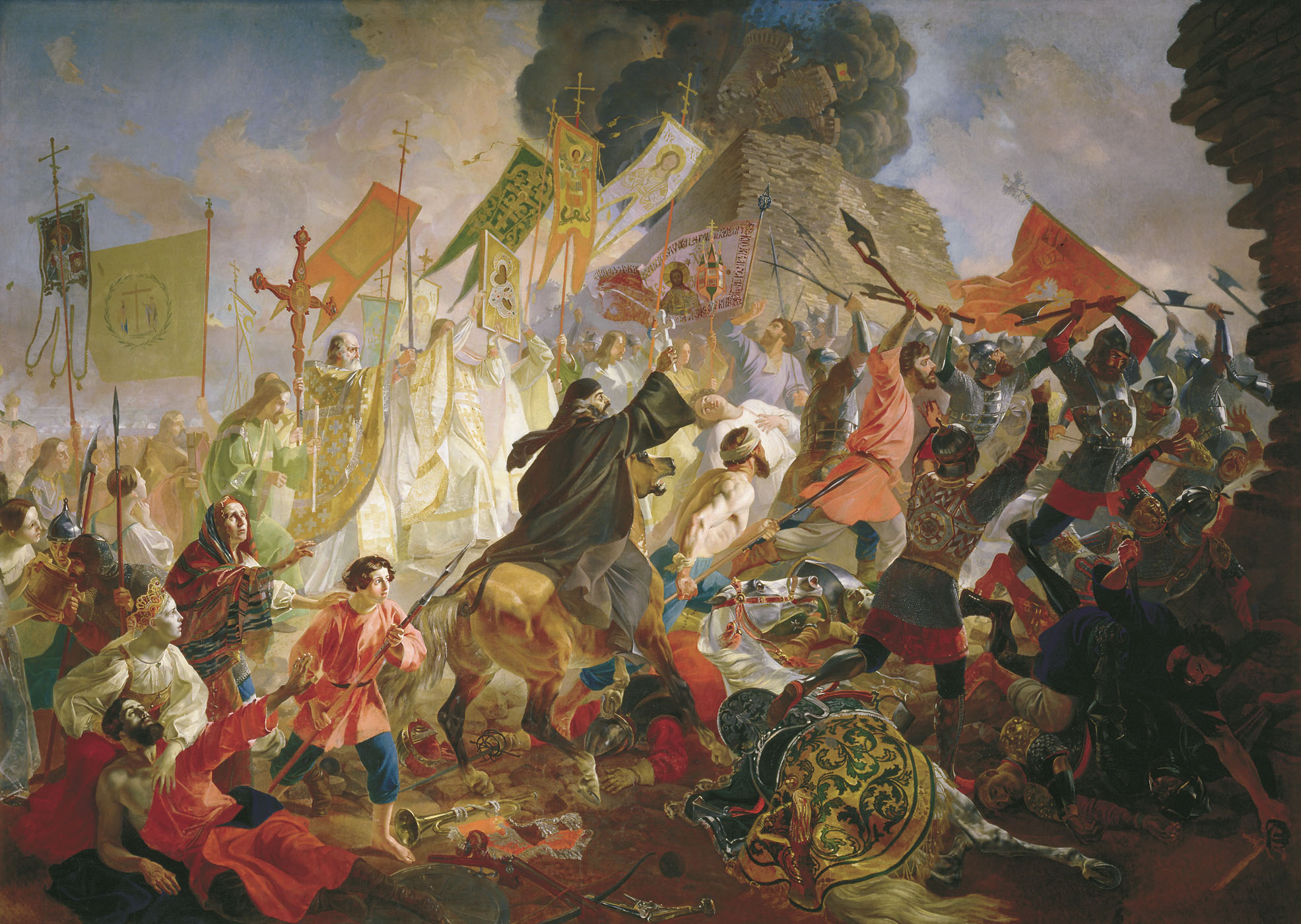
Siege of Pskov by Polish king Stephen Báthory, 1839—1843, Tretyakov Gallery

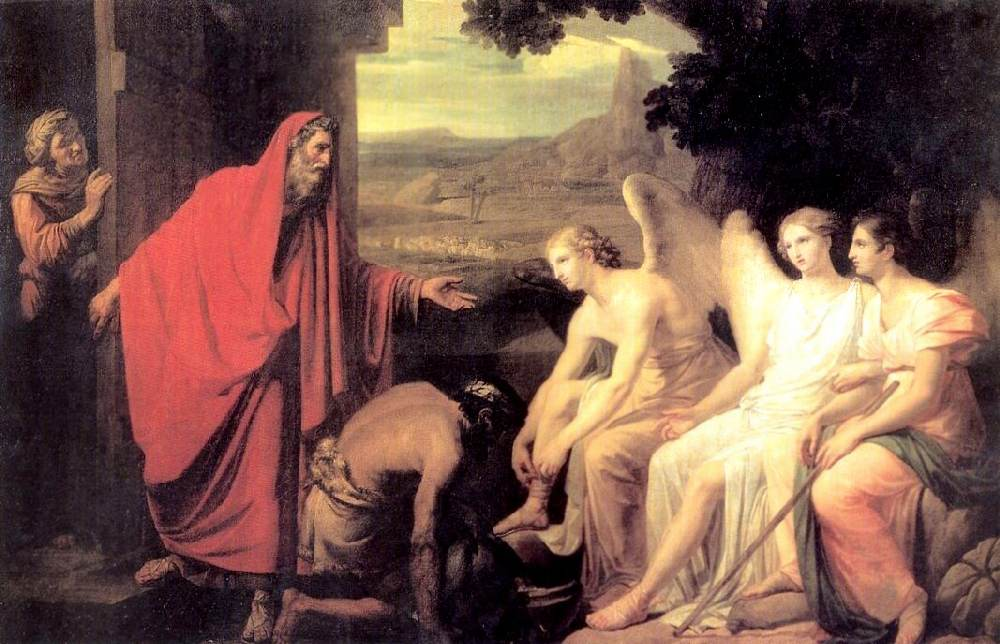
Three Angels Appearing to Abraham at the Oak of Mamre, 1821, Russian Museum

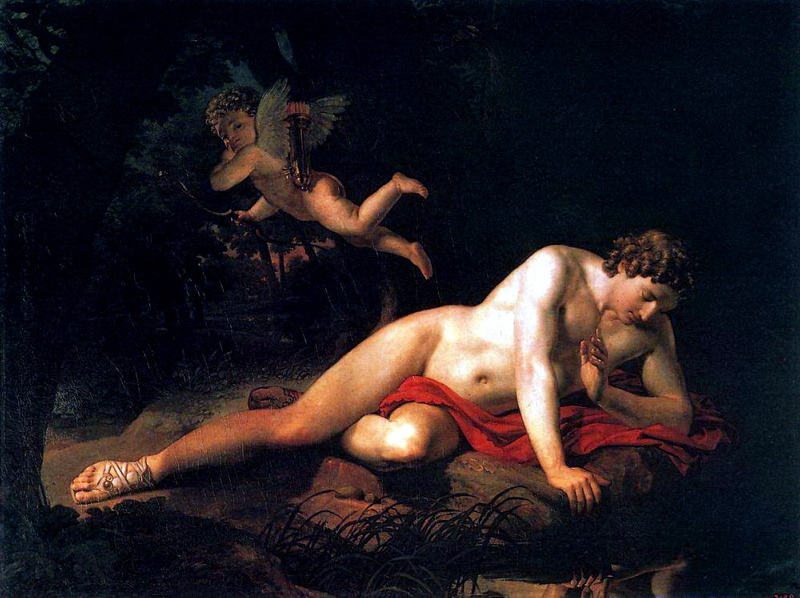
Narcissus, 1819, Russian Museum

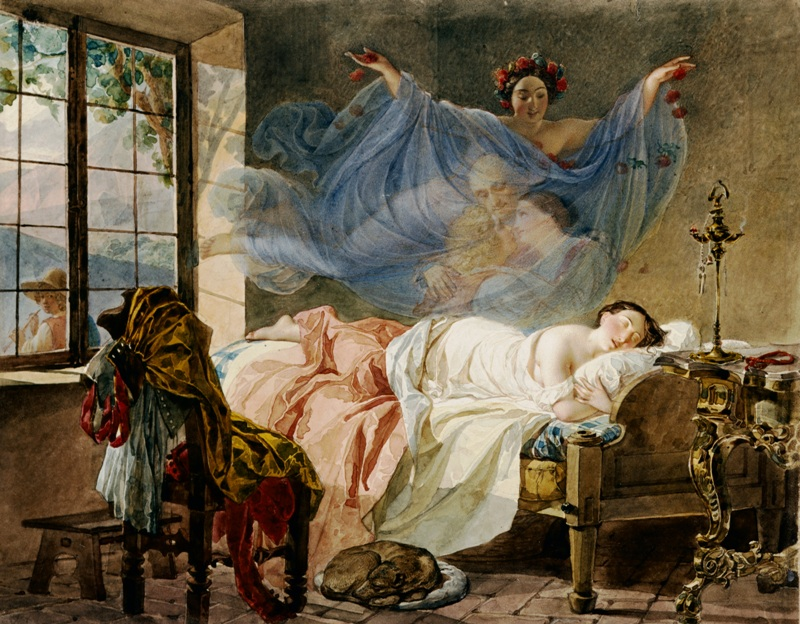
A Dream of a Girl Before a Sunrise, 1830—1833, Pushkin Museum

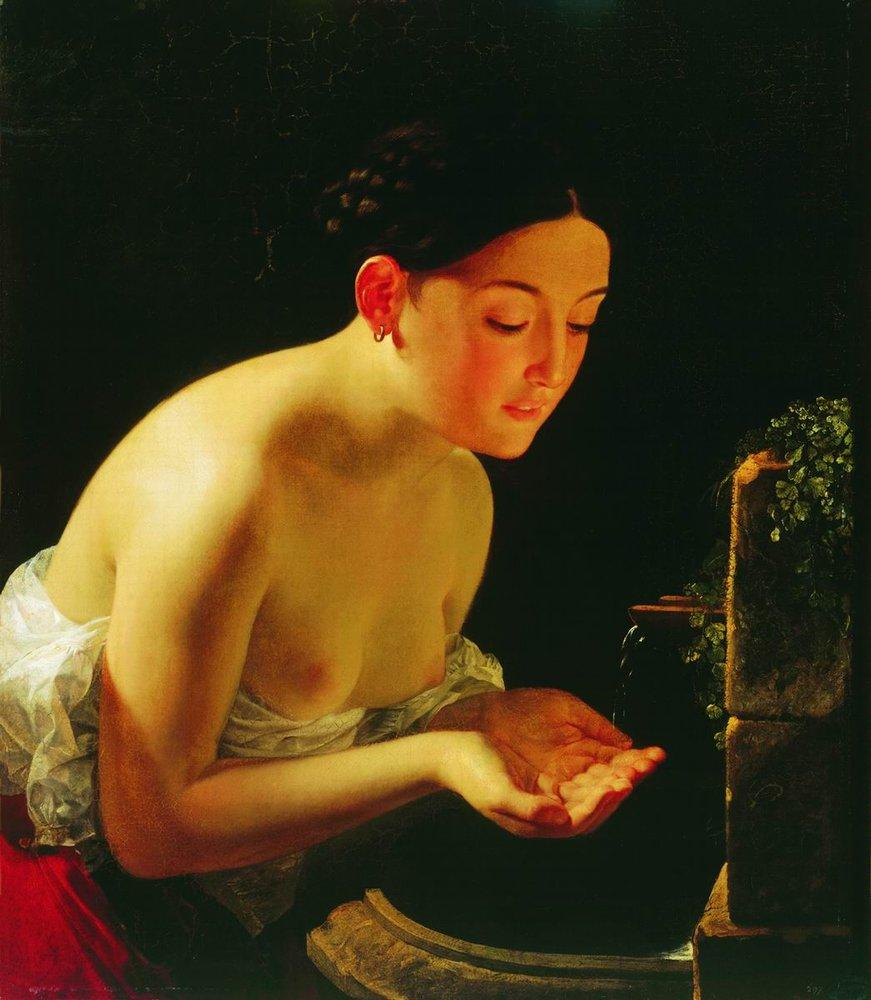
Italian Morning, 1823, Kunsthalle Kiel

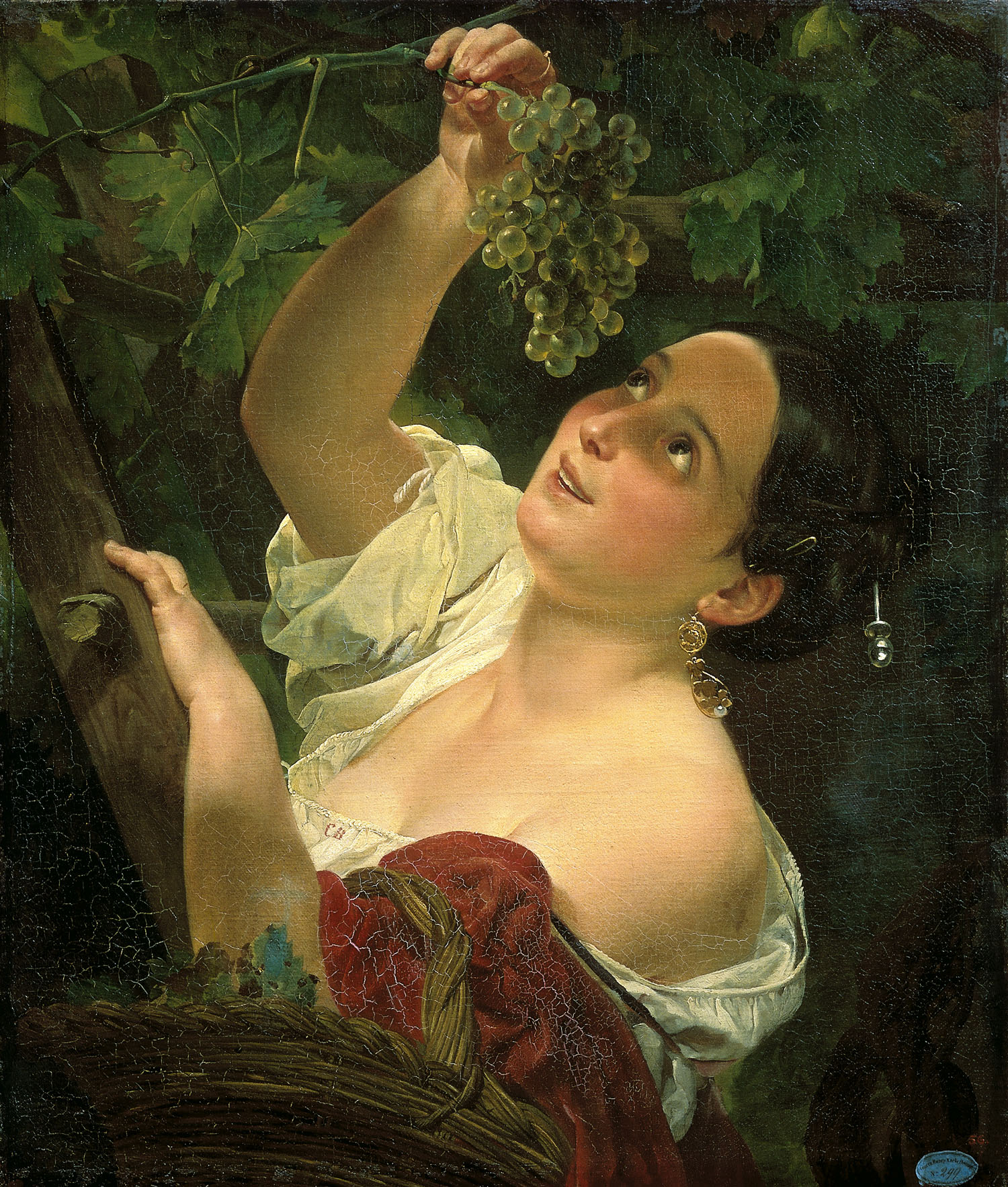
Italian Midday, 1827, Russian Museum

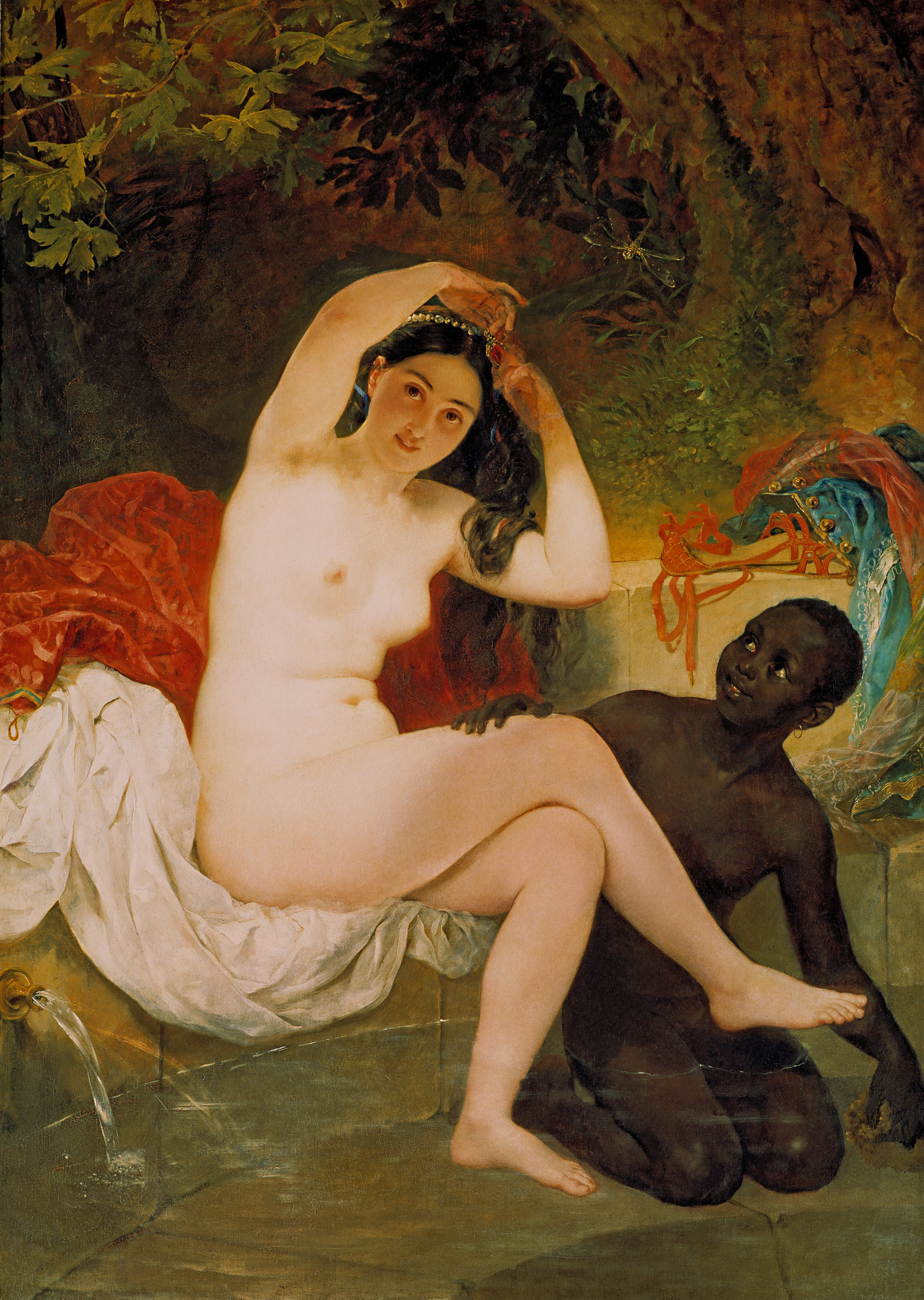
Bathsheba, 1832, Tretyakov Gallery

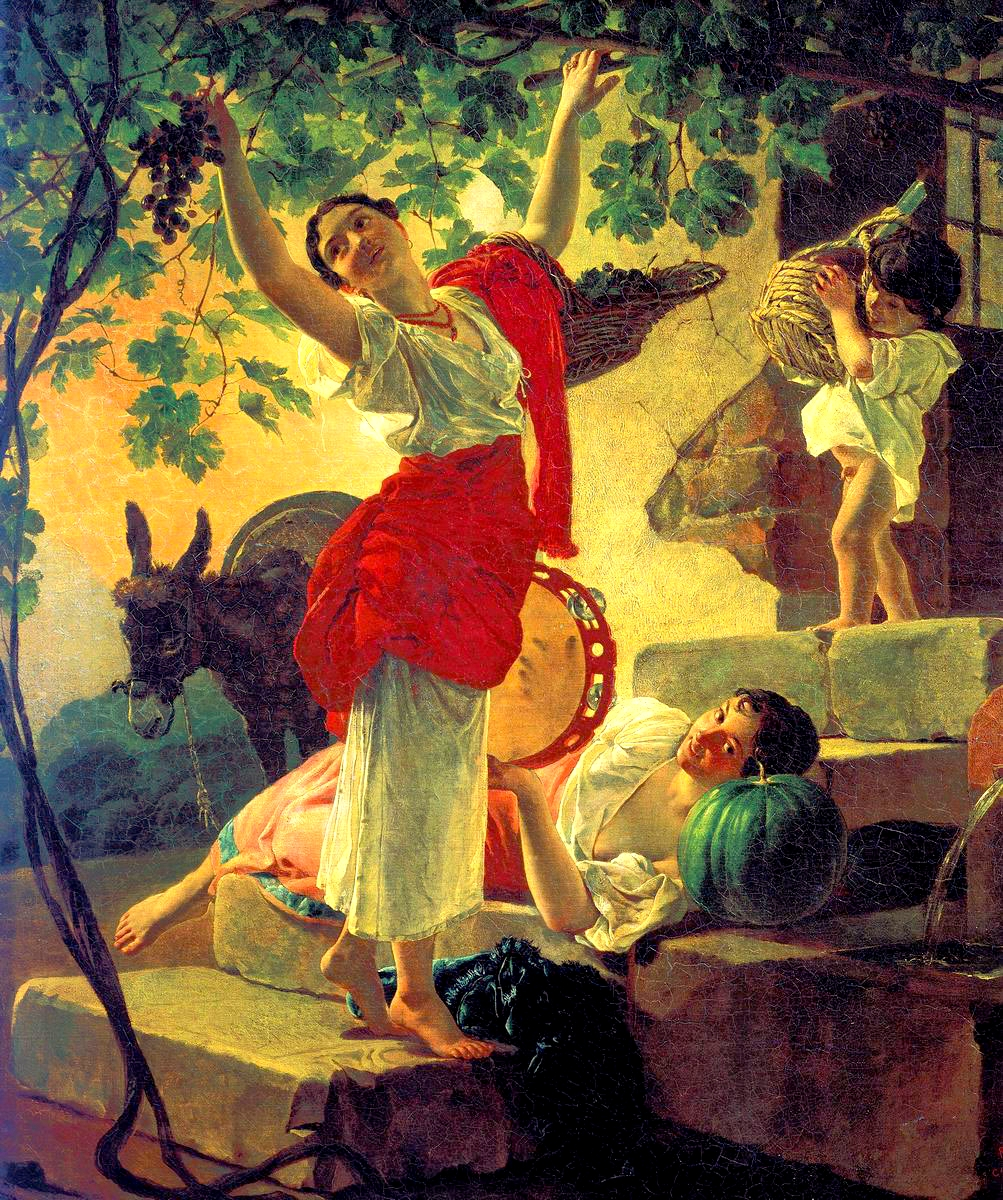
Girl, gathering grapes in the vicinity of Naples, 1827, Russian Museum

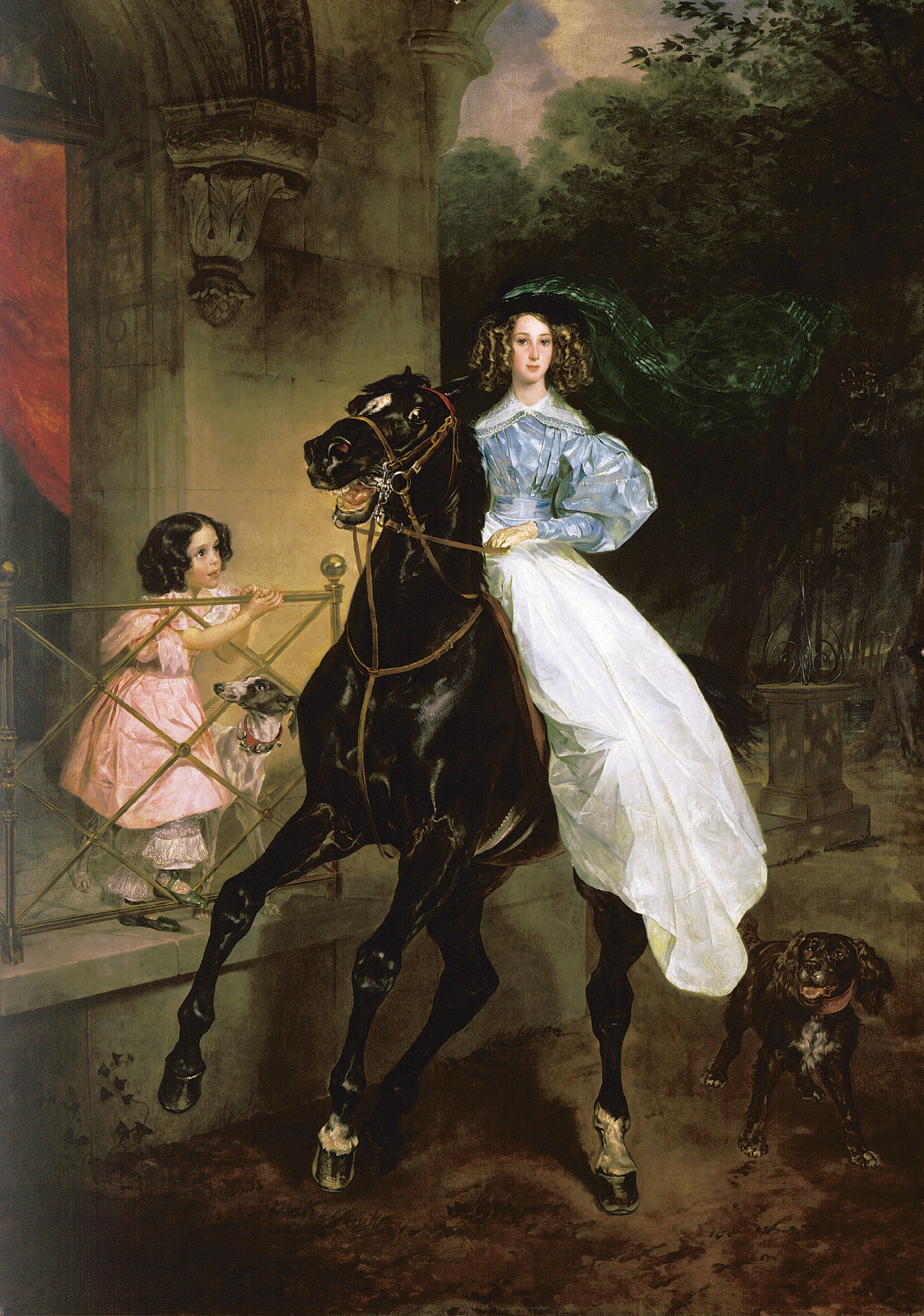
Horsewoman (Daughters of Pacini, Giovannina and Amazilia), 1832, Tretyakov Gallery

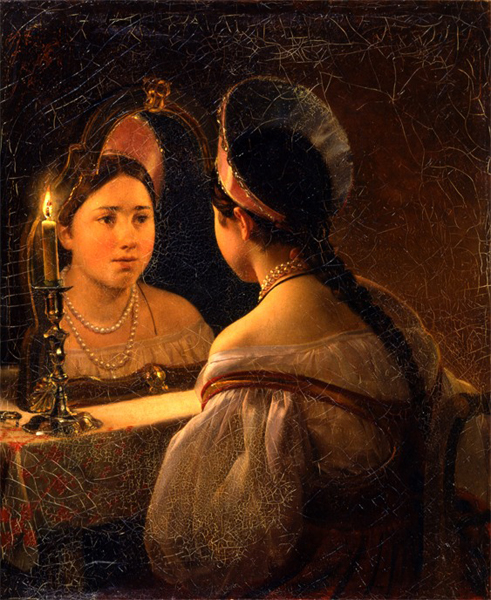
Fortuneteller Svetlana, 1836, Nizhny Novgorod State Art Museum

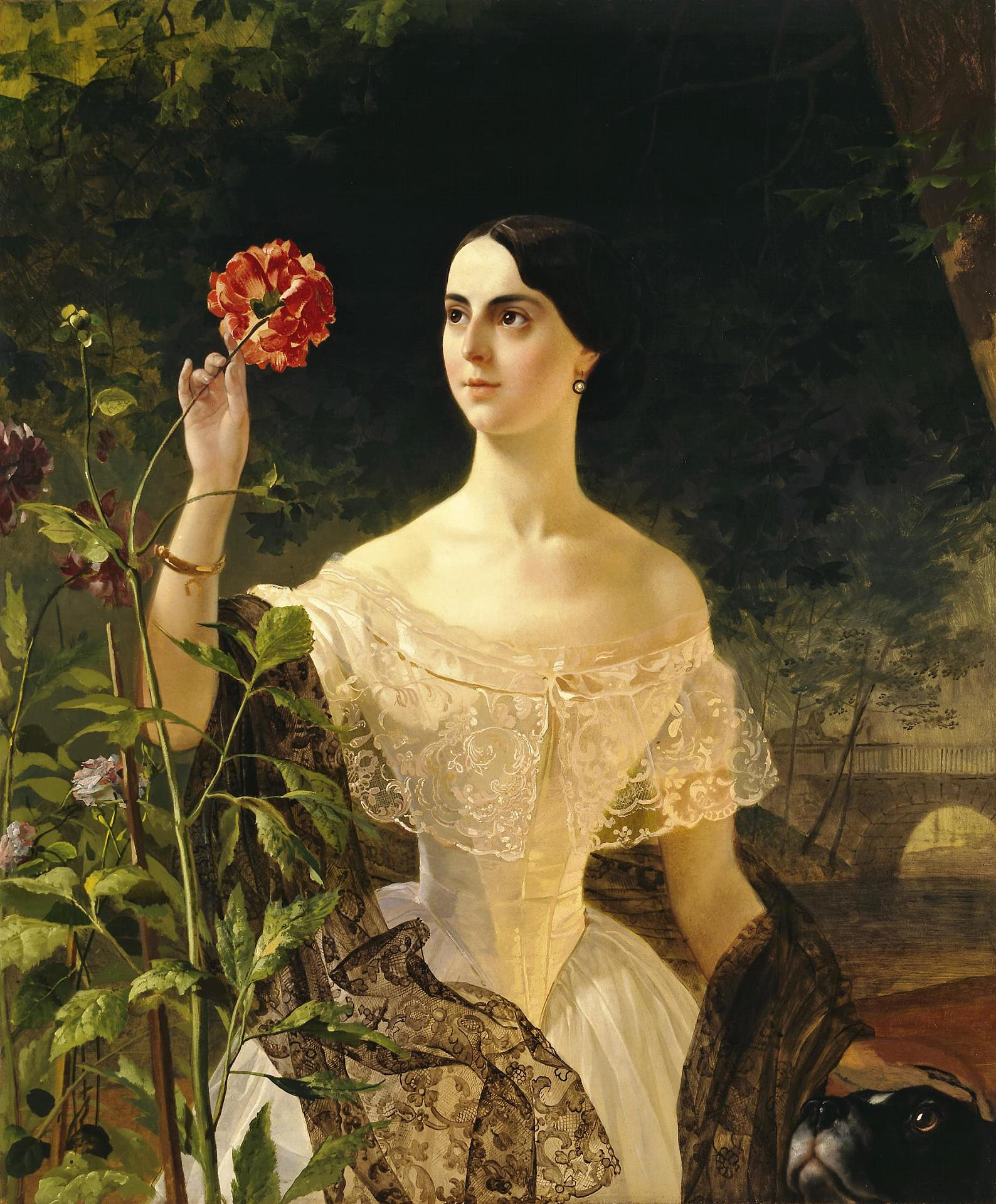
Portrait of Sophia Andreevna Bobrinskaya (Shuvalova), 1849, Hermitage Museum

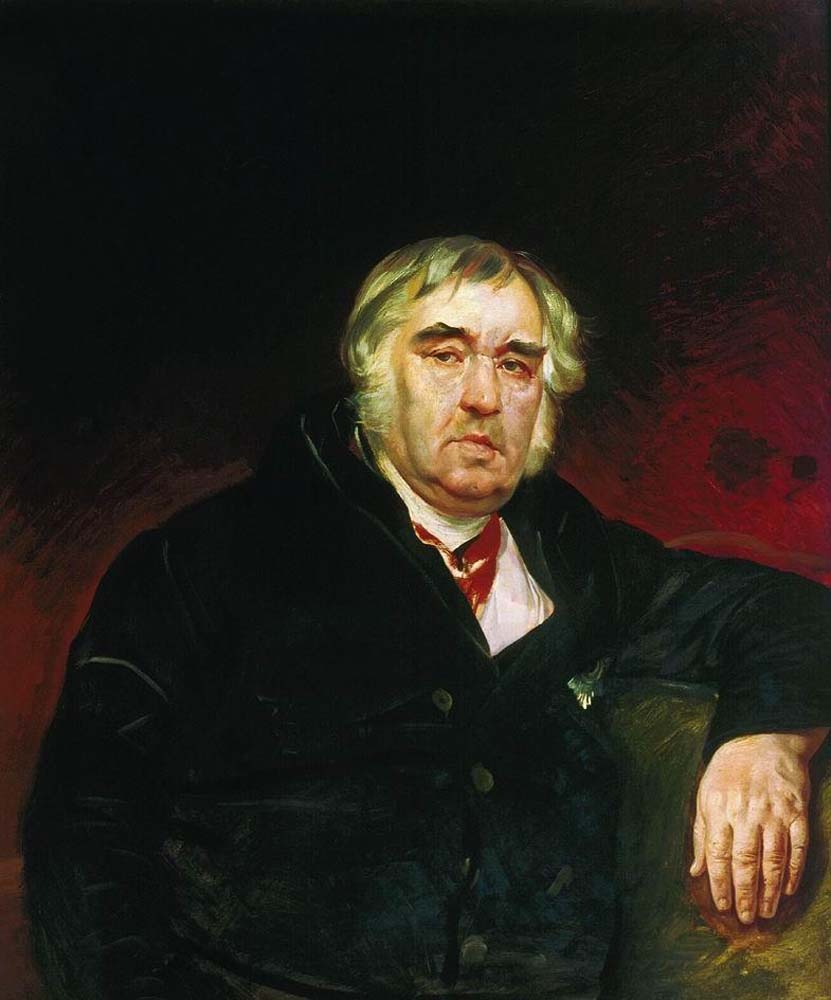
Ivan Krylov, 1839, Tretyakov Gallery

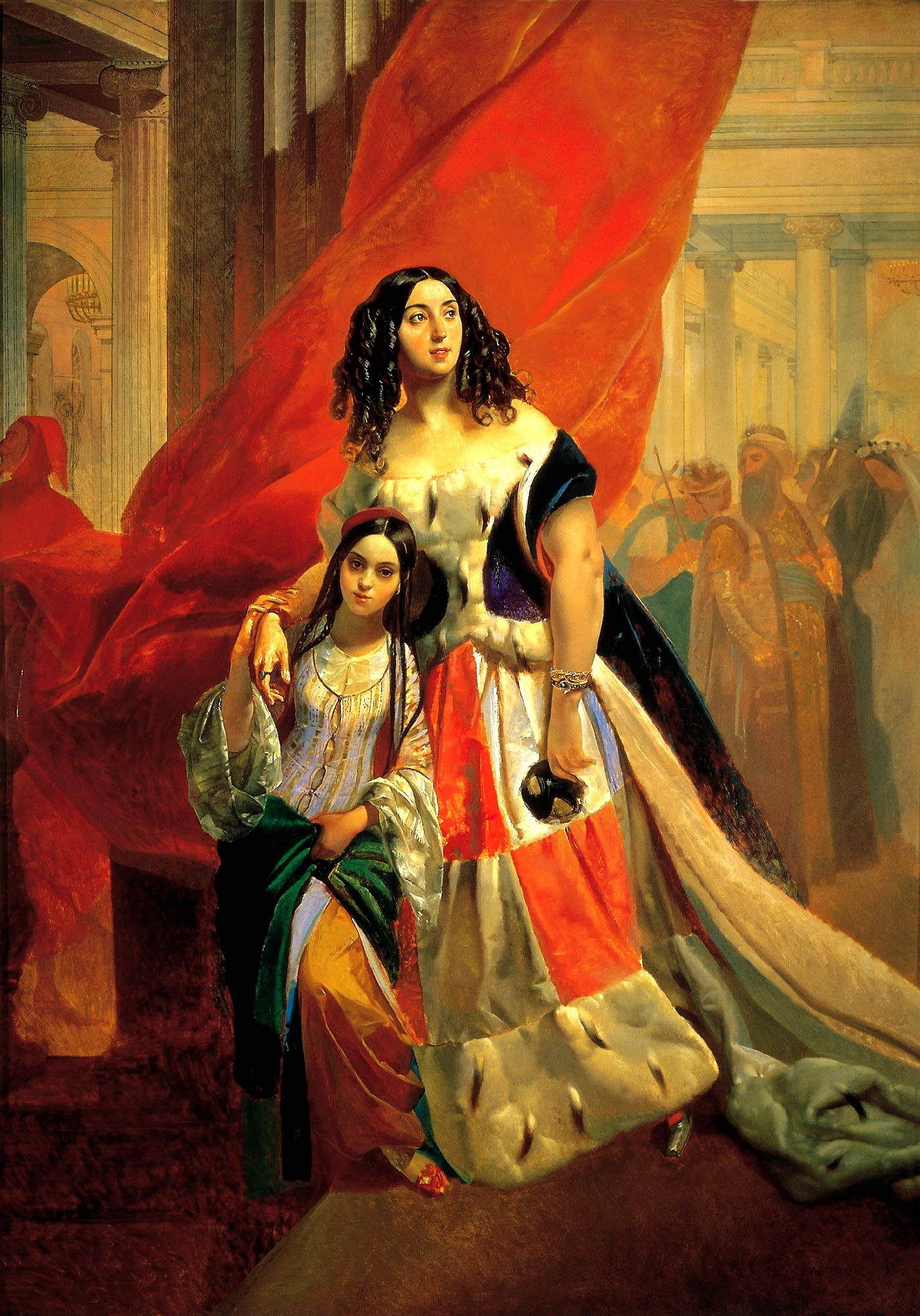
Portrait of Countess Julia Pavlovna Samoilova moving away from the ball with her adopted daughter Amazilia Pacini (Masquerade). Not later than 1842. Russian Museum

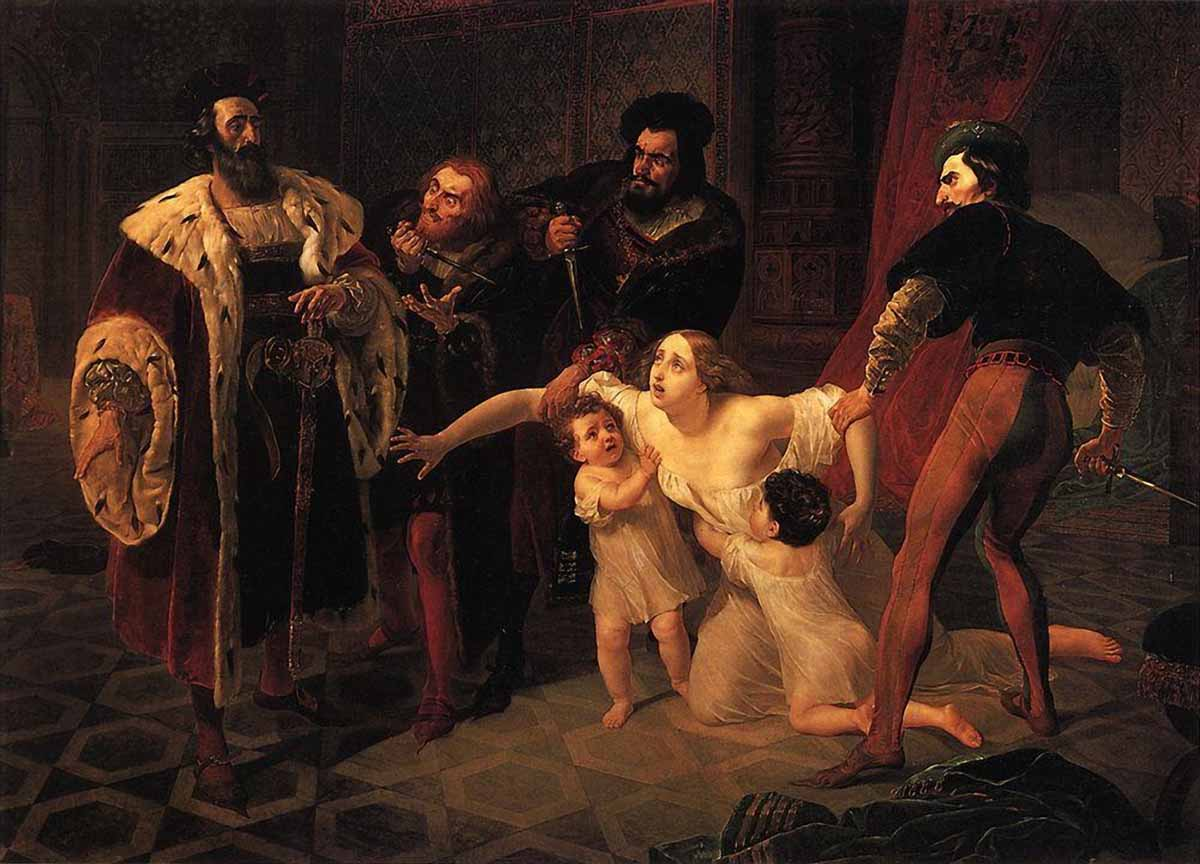
The Death of Ines de Castro, 1834, Russian Museum

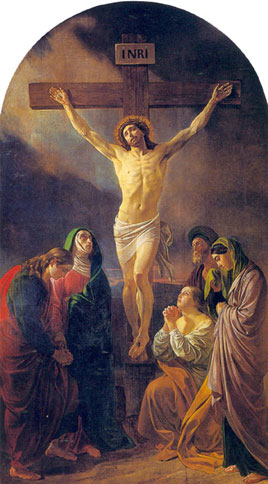
Crucifixion, 1838, Russian Museum

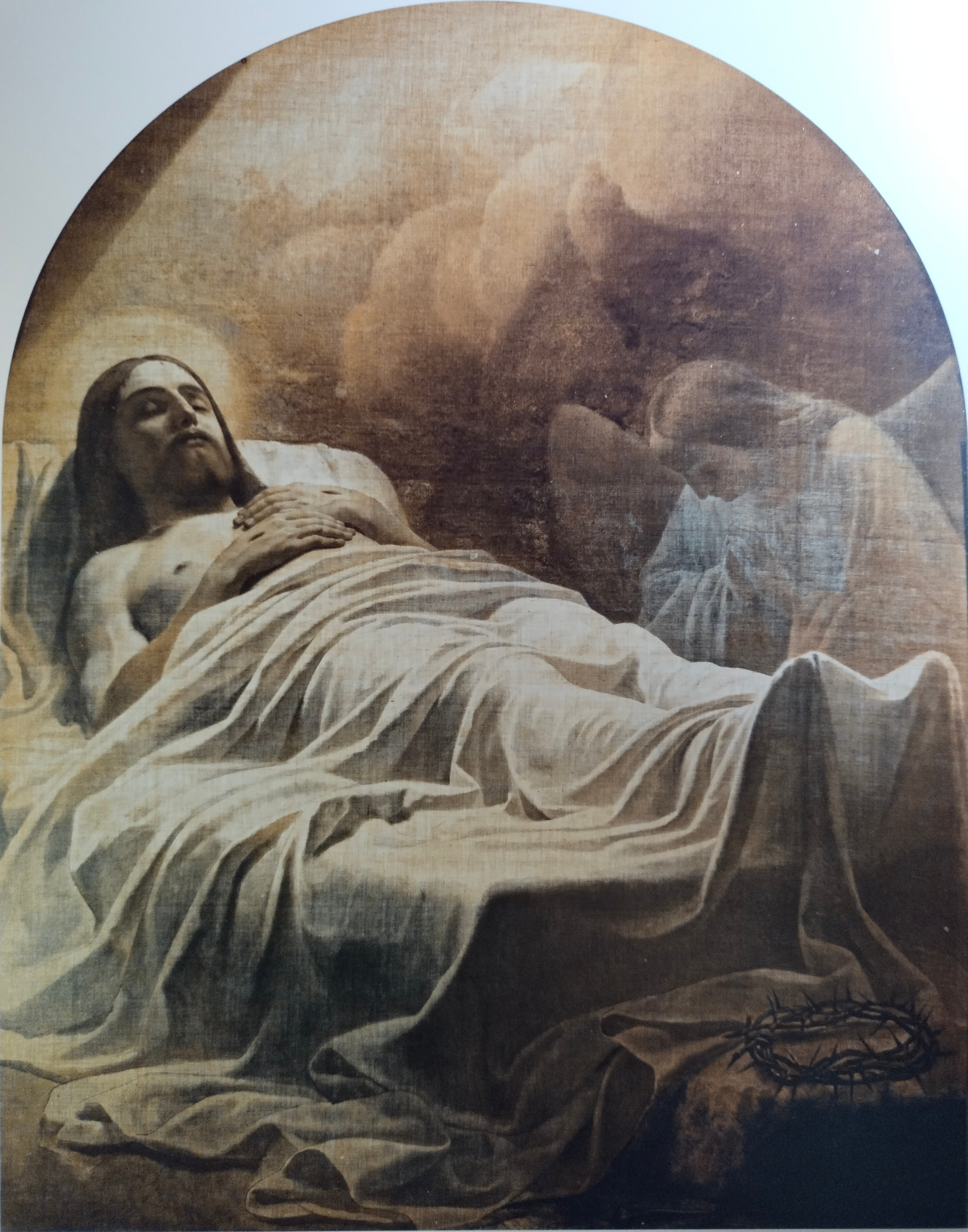
Christ in the Tomb, 1845—1846, Russian Museum
