= Hüther =

Hüther, Huether or Huther (German: occupational name for a herdsman, field guard or guardian Middle High German hüetære) is a German-language surname. It may refer to:

- Bruce Huther (born 1954), former American football linebacker
- Erv Huether, former South Dakota State University baseball coach
- Gerald Hüther (born 1951), German neurobiologist
- Gordon Huether (born 1959), German-American artist
- Mc Moordy King Hüther (born 1999), German footballer
- Michael Hüther (born 1962), German economist
- Mike Huether (born 1962), American philanthropist and politician from South Dakota
- The Huether Hotel in Waterloo, Ontario, Canada
