= Fabrizio Chiari =

Italian painter

Venus and Mercury with Children
Original by Nicolas Poussin	Etching by Fabrizio Chiari

Fabrizio Chiari (c.1615–1695 (Note: Pellegrino Antonio Orlandi gives 1621 as his birth year.)) was an Italian painter and engraver who spent his entire life in Rome.

Chiari's early etchings from Nicolas Poussin paintings are described by Michael Bryan as "executed in a scratchy but masterly style"; among them are:

- Mars and Venus, in a landscape, signed "Fabritius Clarus" 1635.
- Venus and Mercury with Children, signed "Chlarus" 1636
- Venus and Adonis, signed "Nicolaus Pussinus"; This etching has been erroneously attributed to Poussin.

Chiari was enrolled in the Accademia di San Luca from 1635. In San Martino ai Monti in the 1640s he painted the altarpiece, St Martin Dividing his Cloak with the Beggar, and a fresco, The Baptism of Christ, which was overpainted in the 18th century by Antonio Cavallucci. To mark the 1658 canonization of Thomas of Villanova, he painted St. Thomas of Villanova Distributing Alms for Santa Maria del Popolo. His Assumption of the Virgin and Death of St Anne, commissioned in 1654 for the chapel of Regina Coeli convent, were misplaced when it became a prison in 1880; the latter turned up in 2012 and in 2019 sold for $30,000 at Sotheby's. Others of Chiari's works are no longer known, including church paintings mentioned by Filippo Titi and drawings listed by Nicola Pio. In 1675 Chiari decorated the Sala degli Specchi in the Palazzo Altieri, including a ceiling fresco, The Chariot of Apollo, (Note: Not to be confused with the ceiling fresco of the same name in the Palazzo Barberini by Giuseppe Bartolomeo Chiari.) in which the cornices, unusually, depict the four ages of man rather than the four seasons.
