= Vejano =

- Comune
- Comune di Vejano
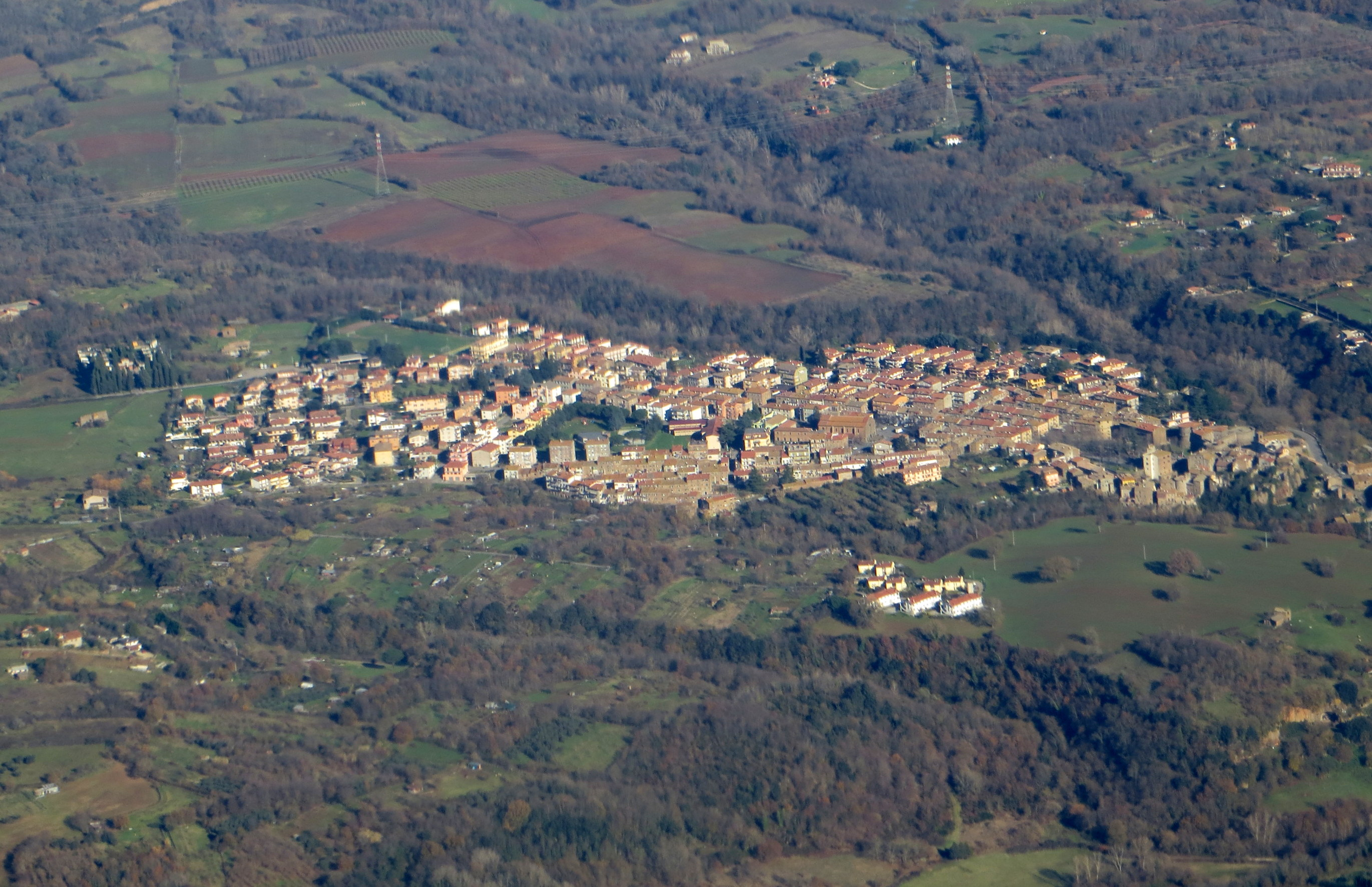

- Location within Italy Location within Lazio
- Coordinates: 42°13′N 12°5′E
- Country: Italy
- Region: Lazio
- Province: Viterbo (VT)

Government
  - Mayor: Teresa Pasquali (Tradizione ed Innovazione (tradition and innovation), civic list)

Area
  - Total: 44.4 km^{2} (17.1 sq mi)
- Elevation: 390 m (1,280 ft)

Population (31 December 2010)
  - Total: 2,337
  - Density: 52.6/km^{2} (136/sq mi)
- Time zone: UTC+1 (CET)
  - Summer (DST): UTC+2 (CEST)
- Postal code: 01010
- Dialing code: 0761
- Patron saint: Sant'Orsio
- Website: Official website

Vejano or Veiano (Italian pronunciation: [veˈjaːno]) is a comune (municipality) in the Province of Viterbo, formerly known as Tuscia, in the Italian region of Latium, located about 60 kilometres (37 mi) northwest of Rome and about 40 kilometres (25 mi) south of Viterbo on the Mignone river. It is an agricultural village at an altitude of about 400 meters, situated between the hills of Tolfa and Cimini. The main monument of the village is La Rocca, an imposing castle, excavated in tuff rock, with a triangular shape and fortified walls. Originally called Viano, it changed its name to Veggiano in 1845 and then to Vejano in 1872.

The name possibly comes from Veio, the Etruscan city just to the north of Rome that was defeated by the Romans in 396 BC. It is believed to have been inhabited by Etruscans, although there is no clear evidence of this fact. In the Augustan era, Vejano became an important centre as it was situated along the route of the Via Clodia.

From 1493 to 1664 Viano was the property of the Santacroce family. It then passed into the hands of the Altieri family. The castle is now owned by Princes of Naples Rampolla, relatives of Cardinal Mariano Rampolla del Tindaro, Secretary of State of Pope Leo XIII. Other properties were sold by the Altieris at the beginning of the 20th Century, to a university and to private citizens.

== Twin towns ==
Vejano is twinned with:

- Santorso, Italy
