= Fortuneteller Svetlana =

1836 painting by Karl Bryullov

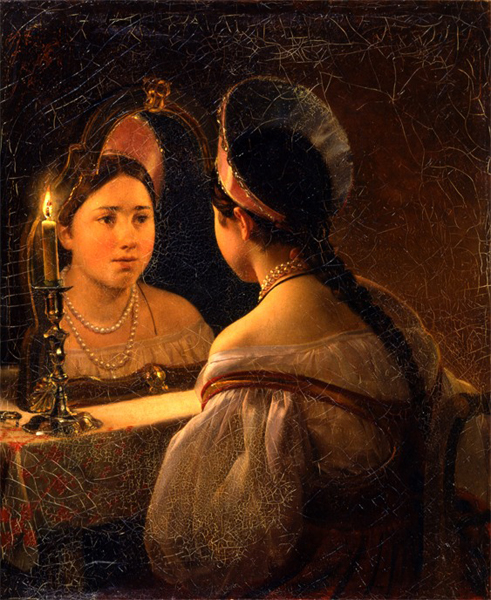
- Artist: Karl Bryullov
- Year: 1836
- Medium: oil on canvas
- Dimensions: 94 cm × 81 cm (37 in × 32 in)
- Location: Nizhny Novgorod State Art Museum; Nizhny Novgorod

Fortuneteller Svetlana is a painting by the Russian artist Karl Bryullov, from 1836, based on the ballad of Vasily Zhukovsky "Svetlana". This is the only painting by the artist created on the theme of Russian national life. It is stored in the Nizhny Novgorod State Art Museum.

== History ==
At the end of the summer of 1835, Bryullov 's painting The Last Day of Pompeii, which brought him fame, arrived from Italy, where it was painted, to Saint Petersburg. The canvas made an impression on Nicholas I of Russia, and he granted Bryullov the post of professor at the Imperial Academy of Arts and immediately summoned him to the capital. The artist at that time was in Constantinopolis, and having received the order of the sovereign, immediately went to St. Petersburg. His trip passed through Moscow, where he arrived on December 25, 1835. In Moscow, the artist stayed for six months where he lived with Antony Pogorelsky, for whom he made "Guessing Svetlana" during his stay in the city. The artist's arrival coincided with the eve of Christmas, and Bryullov was able to observe the rite of fortune-telling in Perovsky's house, which helped to give the painting "life".

Before the October Revolution, the painting was in the collection of Vladimir Orlov-Davydov. Afterwards, it was transferred to the Nizhny Novgorod State Art Museum, where it remains to this day. The current conservation status is satisfactory.

== Plot ==
The painting depicts a scene of Christmas divination. A girl with a fair-haired braid in a kokoshnik and a Russian sarafan sits with her back to the viewer. In front of her, on the table, there is a burning candle in a high candlestick and a figured mirror, into which the heroine looks fearfully and tensely, hoping to see her betrothed in the reflection. The plot was inspired by the ballad 'Svetlana'.

== Artistic features ==
Bryullov managed to convey romantic mysticism, in the spirit of which the original ballad was written. In the subtext of the picture, the mirror is guessed as a symbol of connection with the other world; reflection in the mirror - as the duality of interpretation inherent in romanticism; and the scene of fortune-telling itself is like a desire to go beyond reality.

== Public perception ==
The painting evoked a lively response in Moscow, where the artist lived. Ivan Dmitriev hurried to write about this to P. Svinin: "He wrote here ... for Perovsky a small picture representing a handsome girl in common Russian clothes." Shalikov published verses about this in Moskovskiye Vedomosti:

Bryullov, who painted a young girl in a Russian dress in front of a mirror,

Bow down your brow, friend of genius, before the one

who dominates creative art, the

Soulless suddenly endows everything -

And life, and beauty, and feeling.
