= Oriolo Romano =

- Comune
- Comune di Oriolo Romano
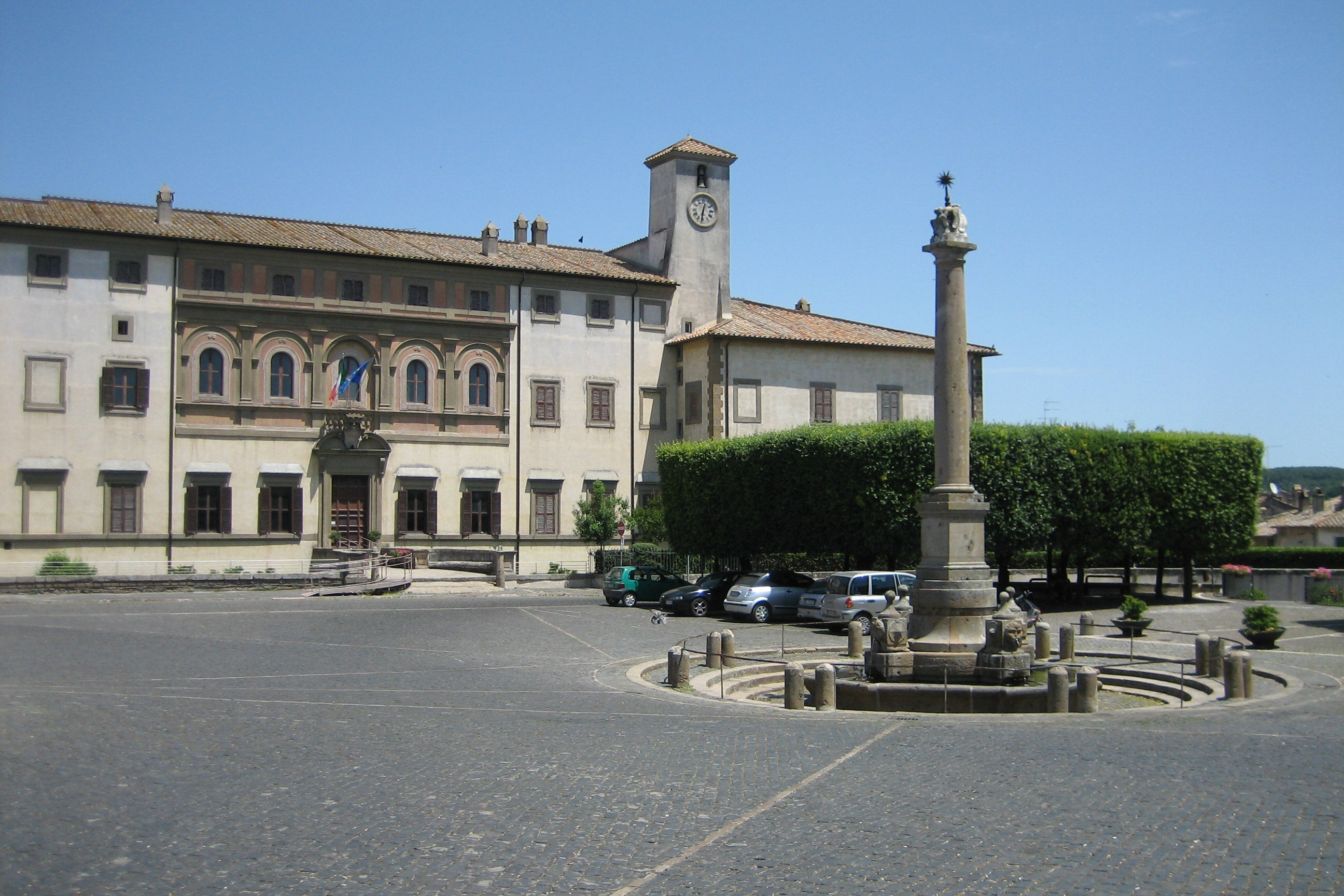

- Coat of arms

- Location within Italy Location within Lazio
- Coordinates: 42°9′33″N 12°8′18″E
- Country: Italy
- Region: Lazio
- Province: Viterbo (VT)

Government
  - Mayor: Emanuele Rallo

Area
  - Total: 19.32 km^{2} (7.46 sq mi)
- Elevation: 420 m (1,380 ft)

Population (31 December 2017)
  - Total: 3,781
  - Density: 195.7/km^{2} (506.9/sq mi)
- Demonym: Oriolesi
- Time zone: UTC+1 (CET)
  - Summer (DST): UTC+2 (CEST)
- Postal code: 01010
- Dialing code: 06
- Patron saint: St. George
- Saint day: 23 April
- Website: Official website

Oriolo Romano is a comune (municipality) in the Province of Viterbo in the Italian region of Latium, located about 40 kilometres (25 mi) northwest of Rome and about 30 kilometres (19 mi) south of Viterbo on a hilly area near the ancient Via Clodia.

== Main sights ==
- Palazzo Altieri di Oriolo, enlarged in 1674 during the papacy of Clement X, a member of the Altieri family. It has frescoes with stories of the Old Testament and landscapes of Altieri's former fiefs.
- Fontana delle Picche, fountain designed by Jacopo Barozzi da Vignola.
- Olmate, a complex of tree-sided alleys which connects Oriolo to Montevirginio, a frazione of Canale Monterano.
- Parco della Mola, located in the middle of a national park a few km away from the main village. La Mola offers hiking trails, a natural thermal water bath and a small lake with a waterfall.
