= Field warden =

The field warden (Latin: camparius; Italian: camparo) was an urban official operating at least from the twelfth century onward across the Italian peninsula. Working alongside other officials, he acted as a rural policing agent on behalf of the region’s growing cities. As such, he is to be distinguished from the field guard or rural custodian, also commonly referred to as a camparius or camparo, who was generally employed in private service by a landlord, including rural or urban monasteries.

The field warden enforced the policies that cities developed to manage their surrounding countryside, which became an increasingly important concern as urban populations grew from the eleventh century on. To avoid an over-reliance on long-distance trade, many cities chose to steer hinterland production to serve their own needs, for both feeding their communities and supporting urban production and commerce. As such, field wardens constantly patrolled the rural territories cities laid claim to, focusing attention on agricultural activities, including animal husbandry. Field wardens also ensured that rural infrastructures such as waterways, bridges, roads and fences were well maintained, so that goods, animals and human traffic met fewer obstacles.

Although in general they are poorly documented officials, field wardens in some regions, notably Piedmont, recorded their daily activities, including fines they meted out to those who violated urban ordinances pertaining to the countryside. These could be selling produce off-market, allowing animals to graze illicitly in another person’s field, theft of produce, arson and general trespassing. In their policing function field masters highly resembled those of their intramural counterpart, the road master.

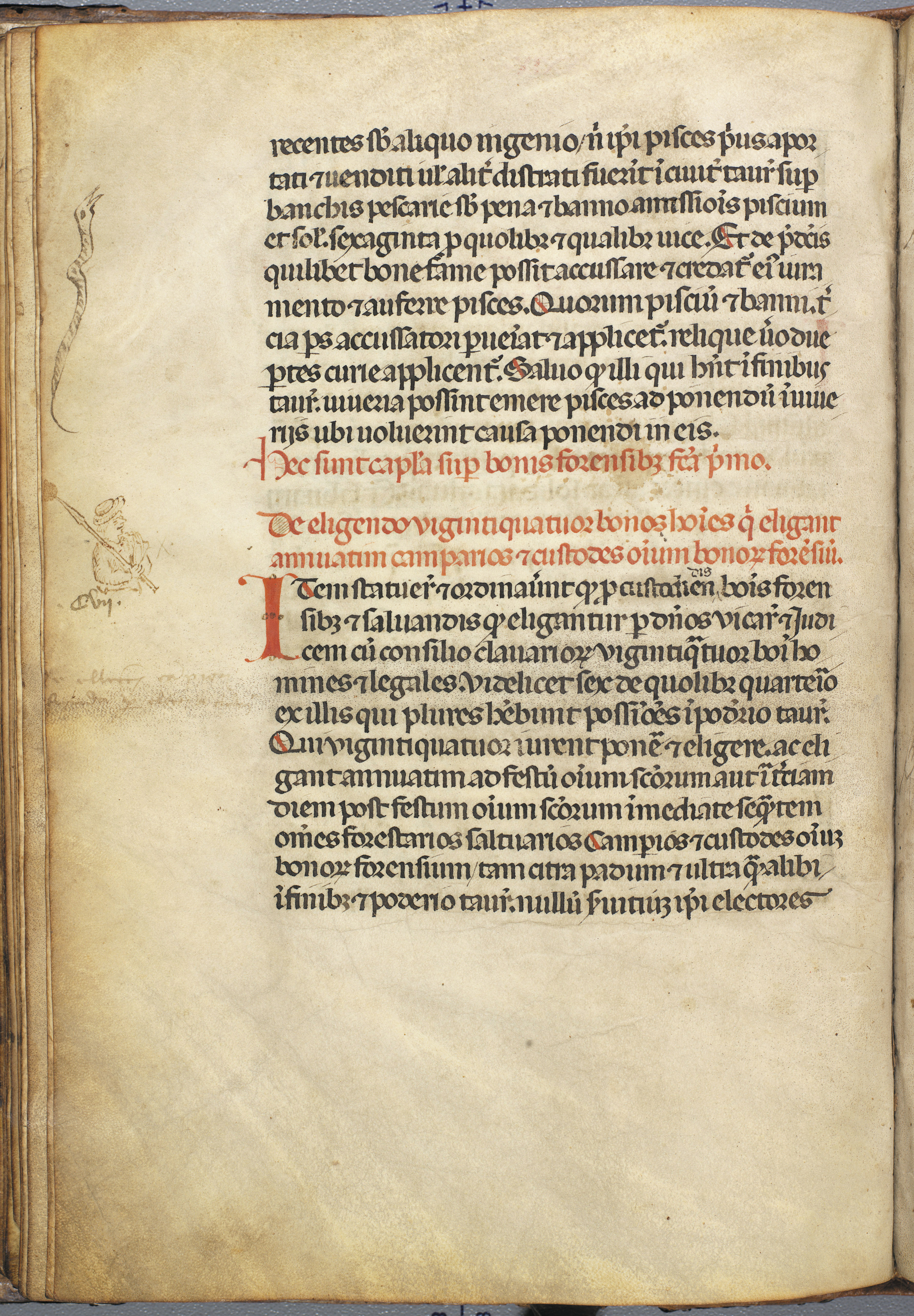
A field warden (camparius) in Turin's 14th-century statutes. Archivio Storico della Città di Torino, Carte sciolte 390, Codex catena, f. 29v

Field wardens were adult men generally chosen from among a city’s different quarters for non-consecutive terms of six or twelve months. Attempts to integrate them into the podesta's entourage or create centralized offices tended to fail. They were usually salaried but could earn additional income from successful prosecution of violators and they collected fees from rural landlords for their monitoring services, whether these were actually required or not. Despite making negligible contributions to urban and ducal coffers, and running into resistance by rustics and rural landlords, field masters soon became important cogs in urban administrations throughout Italy.
