= Palazzo Altieri =

Coordinates: 41°53′46.8″N 12°28′44.5″E

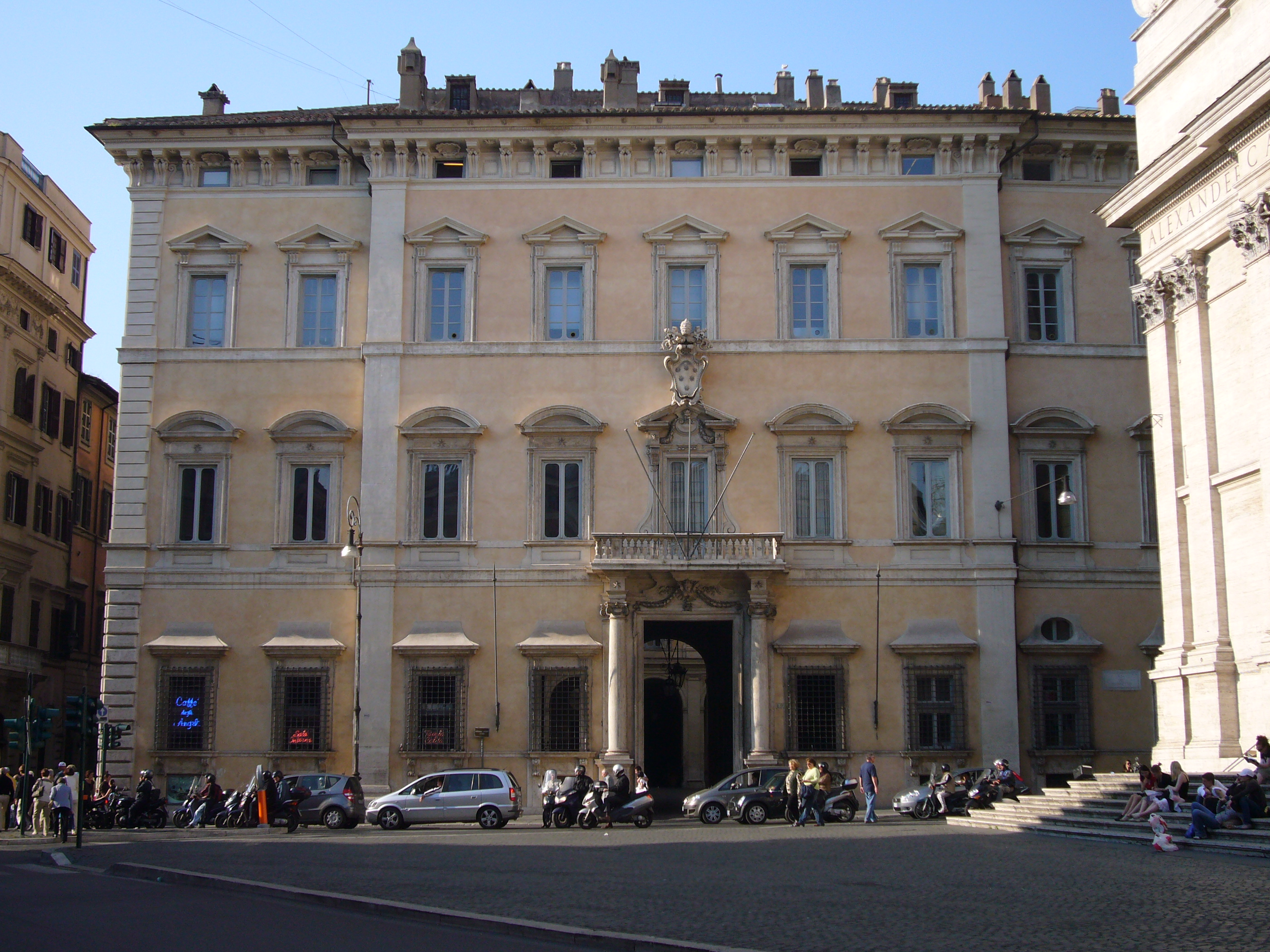
- The Palazzo Altieri
- Interactive map of the Palazzo Altieri area

General information
- Location: Rome, Italy

Palazzo Altieri is a palace in Rome, which was the home of the Altieri family in the city. The palace faces the square in front of the Church of the Gesù.

== The Altieri ==
The Altieri were one of the prominent families in Rome claiming descendancy from Roman nobility, and included Pope Clement X (reigned 1670-1676).

When Giambattista Altieri was elevated to Cardinal by Pope Urban VIII, he decided his existing house was not impressive enough; not befitting his new title so in 1650 he commissioned Giovan Antonio de' Rossi to begin renovations at the site. When Pope Clement ascended to the papal throne in 1670, further renovations were overseen by the pope's Cardinal-Nephew, Paluzzo Paluzzi Altieri degli Albertoni.

By 1673, the grand salon was complete. Cardinal Camillo Massimo recommended Carlo Maratta as the artist, and Giovanni Bellori helped with the iconography. Clemency (punning with pope's name) is surrounded by Public Happiness and other cardinal virtues.

== Modern use ==
The building is now occupied by a bank, though the interiors still possess major works of art and decoration, including paintings by Luca Giordano, Bernardo Strozzi, Pieter Mulier the younger, Domenico Maria Canuti, Lionello Spada, Fabrizio Chiari, Felice Giani, Vincenzo Camuccini, Francesco Zuccarelli, Francesco Manno and Giuseppe Bonito.
