= Road master =

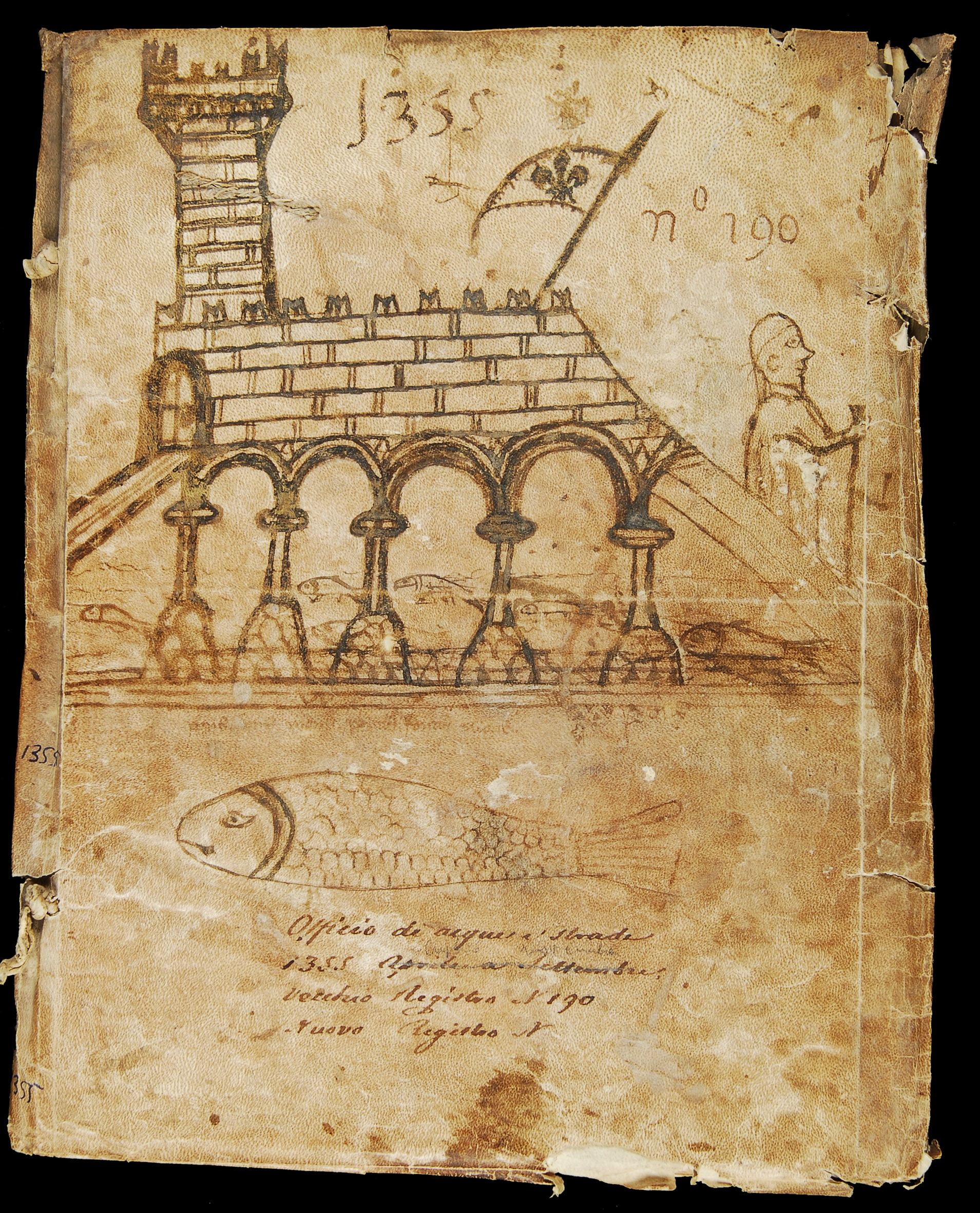
Bologna's dirt (fango) master depicted here in a register from 1355 holding a cane and descending from a fortified bridge stretched across a local river. The water is consciously rendered as flowing and abundant with fish, commonly associated with an image of health.

The road master (Latin: viarius; Italian: Maestro delle Strade) was a middle- to high-ranking urban official common across the central and northern regions of Italy between c. 1250-1550, that is the communal and despotic era. Often part of the podestà’s or capitano del popolo’s entourage, the road master worked in small teams of builders and administrators to maintain a city's network of roads and waterways, including nodal points such as gates, bridges, sluices and markets. In many towns and cities across the peninsula, road masters not only built and maintained such amenities, but they also monitored human and animal behavior that impacted their traversability, and fined pertinent offenders. For instance, they could punish artisans polluting a public street or neighborhood, enforcing a distinct form of urban zoning. Road masters also fought against domestic practices that were seen as causing harm to the population at large, including unlawful refuse disposal and neglecting to restrain pigs.

Roads officials were also active in ensuring urban markets ran smoothly. Beyond the upkeep of roads and canals allowing produce to reach and leave markets, these officials often examined the accuracy of weights and measures used by retailers. They also pursued people who tried to sell produce outside the allowed time and place or wares of inferior quality, such as rotten meat or fish. In doing so, they resembled the Islamicate market inspector or muhtasib. Lastly, roads officials also policed inns and taverns, places where food and drink were sold, to ensure these were of good quality and served in the correct amounts and for the right price. The presence in taverns of alcohol and abundance of foreigners, including sex workers, sometimes meant that roads masters also operated as a moral police force, fighting gambling, rowdiness and sexual promiscuity.

In doing all this, road masters participated in earlier cities’ preventative and harm-reductive programs, designed to promote public health and fight disease at the population level. They had rural parallels in the office of the field warden.

Road masters and their teams are especially well documented for Bologna, where they were known as the Dirt masters (Ufficiali del fango); Lucca; and Rome.
