= Tolfa =

- Comune
- Comune di Tolfa
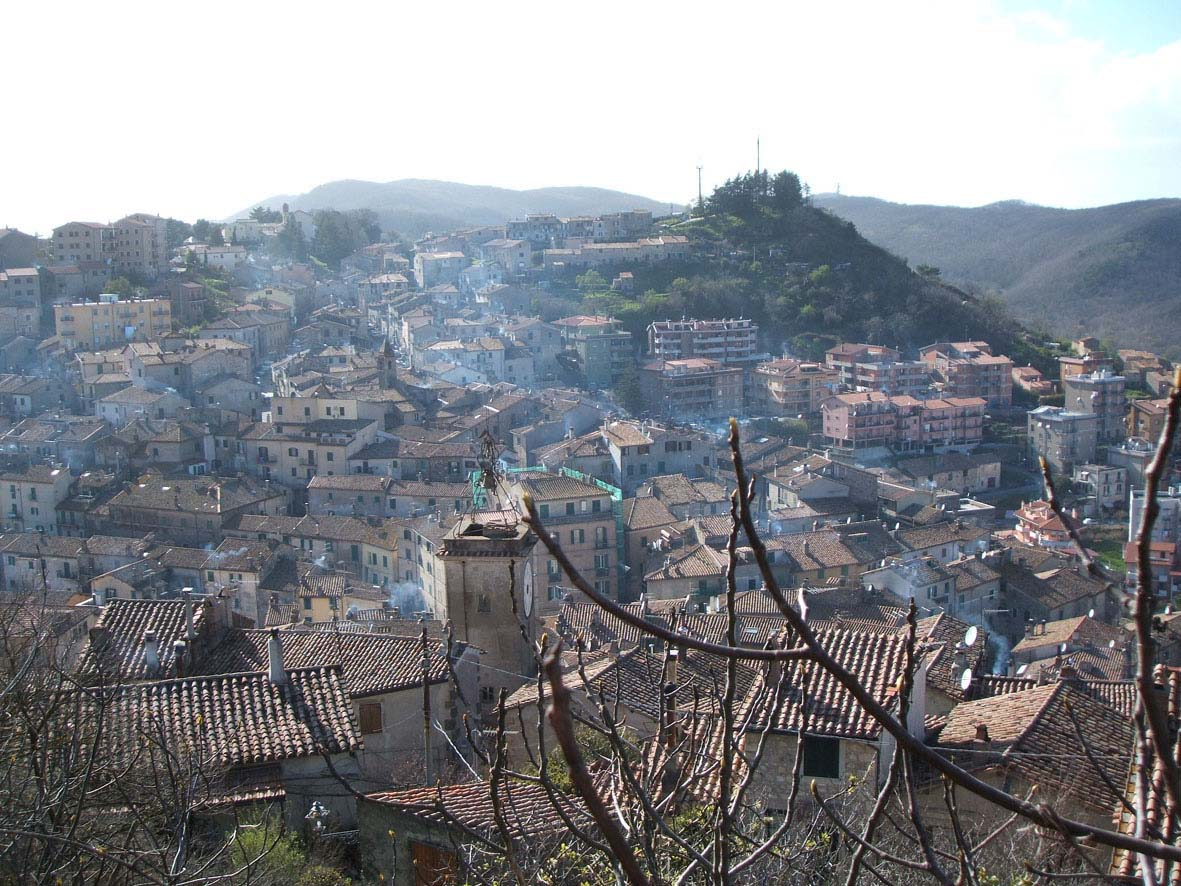
- View of Tolfa

- Location within Italy Location within Lazio
- Coordinates: 42°08′59″N 11°56′12″E
- Country: Italy
- Region: Lazio
- Metropolitan city: Rome (RM)
- Frazioni: Santa Severa Nord

Government
  - Mayor: Luigi Landi

Area
  - Total: 167.56 km^{2} (64.70 sq mi)
- Elevation: 484 m (1,588 ft)

Population (2007)
  - Total: 5,133
  - Density: 30.63/km^{2} (79.34/sq mi)
- Demonym: Tolfetani
- Time zone: UTC+1 (CET)
  - Summer (DST): UTC+2 (CEST)
- Postal code: 00059
- Dialing code: 0766
- Patron saint: St. Giles
- Saint day: September 1
- Website: Official website

Tolfa is a town and comune of the Metropolitan City of Rome, in the Lazio region of central Italy; it lies to the ENE of Civitavecchia by road.

It is the main center in the Monti della Tolfa, an extinct volcanic group between Civitavecchia and the Lake of Bracciano.

Tolfa is a member of Cittaslow.

== History ==
A town of medieval origin in the orbit of Viterbo, it was assumed into the Papal States and granted first to the Capocci family, and then to the Roman nobles Ludovico and Pietro Frangipani who walled the community. Tolfa achieved sudden importance following the discovery there in 1461 of large deposits of alunite, the source of alum, with the result that direct control was assumed, after some confrontations with the Frangipani, by the Camera Apostolica. Alum was an essential mordant in the textile industry, which was central to the Late Medieval and Early Modern Italian economy. Previously, the only supplies of alum were imported from the East, from sources controlled by the Ottoman Turks, through Venice, which profited greatly. Suddenly, the monopoly of alum shifted to the Papacy, which controlled Tolfa; Pope Pius II placed its distribution solely in the hands of the Medici, with the explicit thought that the income from this monopoly should be devoted to the Christian res publica as the infidel Turk, elated by his victories, threatened to devour Christendom. Later, the monopoly in extraction of alum at Tolfa passed as a papal gift to Agostino Chigi.

In 1530, Pope Clement VII granted the status of comune to Tolfa, which had outgrown its medieval walls. In later times, Tolfa continued to be supported by the extraction of alum. Near the mine, the workmen's village of Allumiere was built; it became an autonomous comune in 1826.

== Main sights ==
- Remains of the walls and of the Frangipani castle (Rocca di Tolfa), destroyed by the French troops in 1799 after the city had rebelled against the Roman Republic.
- Town Hall, housing a collection of Etruscan and Roman antiquities discovered nearby.
- Church of Sant'Egidio Abate
- Convent of the Augustinians (early 16th century), now housing the communal library and civic museum.
- Convent of the Capuchin Order (1621).
- Castle Rota

== Film locations ==
- In the TV series, Medici: Masters of Florence, Castle Rota is both Francesco Sforza's army camp and the village where Lorenzo finds the mercenary Ferzetti.

== Twin towns ==
- (Republic of Ireland) Dingle, Ireland
- Għajnsielem, Malta
- Salobreña, Spain
- Slovenske Konjice, Slovenia
