= Basilica of Vitruvius =

- Basilica di Vitruvio (Italian)
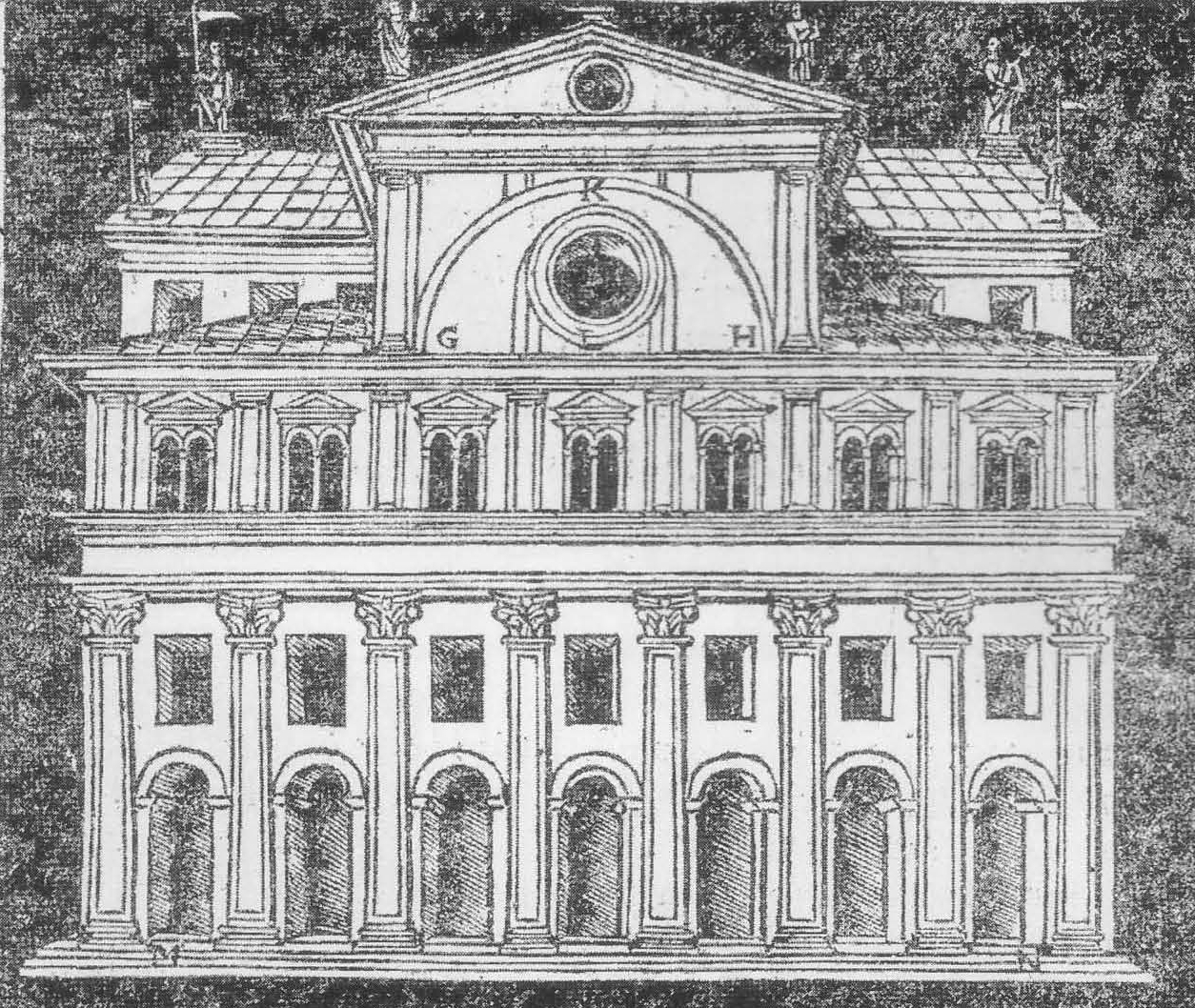
- Reconstruction by Cesare Cesariano (1521)
- Interactive map of Basilica of Vitruvius
- 43.845679°N 13.016038°E
- Type: Civil basilica
- Periods: Augustan
- Location: Fano, Marche, Italy
- Part of: Fanum Fortunae

History
- Built: 1st century BC (c. 19 BC)
- Built by: Vitruvius

Site notes
- Discovered: 19 January 2026
- Condition: Foundations and lower structures; under excavation

The Basilica of Vitruvius (Italian: Basilica di Vitruvio), also known as the Basilica of Fano, was a civil basilica in the Roman city of Fanum Fortunae (modern Fano, in the Marche, Italy), a colony founded or enlarged by Augustus. It is the only building attributed to the Roman architect and theorist Vitruvius, who described it in detail in Book V of his treatise De architectura.

Sought without success for centuries, the remains of the basilica were identified in January 2026 during archaeological excavations beneath Piazza Andrea Costa in the center of Fano. The discovery, announced on 19 January 2026 and hailed by the city's mayor as the "discovery of the century", is regarded as direct evidence of the only known work designed and built by Vitruvius.

== History ==
The importance of the building derives from its being the only work attributed to Vitruvius, the architect and theorist active in the 1st century BC whose treatise De architectura became the theoretical foundation of Western architecture from the Renaissance until the end of the 19th century. In the ten books of the treatise, dedicated to Augustus, Vitruvius mentions only one project of his own: the basilica of Fanum Fortunae, described at length in Book V.

The basilica was built after Augustus made Fanum a colonia under the name Colonia Julia Fanestris, and is conventionally dated to around 19 BC. As a civil basilica it was intended for commerce and for the transaction of official business. The building is thought to have been destroyed during the barbarian incursions of late antiquity.

The basilica has long been of particular interest to architectural theorists, both for its role as an exemplary building and for its functional affinity with Christian sacred architecture. Because the Vitruvian treatise reached the Middle Ages essentially without illustrations and with a corrupted text, however, the reconstructions of the building proposed from the Renaissance onwards remained uncertain and hypothetical.

== Vitruvius's description ==
In Book V of De architectura, after setting out the minimum and maximum proportions for basilicas, namely ratios of 3:1 and 2:1 between length and width, Vitruvius describes the basilica of Fano as a more up-to-date model in which he was personally involved as designer and executor ("conlocavi curavique faciendam"). As emphasized in the edition of Vitruvius edited by Pierre Gros, the plan of the Fano basilica, a rectangle tending toward a square and comparable to the basilica of Cosa, departs from earlier models even though it is particularly well documented in the Augustan age.

Compared with the "paradigmatic" plans, moreover, the basilica of Fano housed new and more strictly political functions. Vitruvius describes a semicircular apse set into the long side of the building, opposite the entrance, enclosing a tribunal that he calls the aedes Augusti. With his description of this so-called "temple of Augustus", Vitruvius made explicit the function of apse and tribunal as evocations of the imperial figure, and disseminated an innovative configuration and its meanings through this arrangement.

== Architecture ==
According to Vitruvius's own account, the basilica was in the Corinthian order and was a building of considerable size. Its central space measured 120 by 60 Roman feet, about 35.5 by 17.8 meters, surrounded by columns, eight on the long sides and four on the short sides. Between the columns and the outer walls ran an ambulatory 20 feet (about 5.9 meters) wide, giving the core of the building overall dimensions of roughly 160 by 100 feet, about 47.4 by 29.6 meters.

The columns were 50 feet (about 14.8 meters) high with a lower diameter of 5 feet (about 1.48 meters). The walls had window openings between the columns at the level of the capitals. The architrave and the entire entablature were of timber, the architrave 2 feet high and the frieze 3 feet high; Vitruvius says nothing about the roof.

Attached to one of the long sides was the shrine dedicated to Augustus, the aedes Augusti, 26 feet wide and containing a semicircular tribunal platform. Two columns were omitted from the middle of that side so that the shrine's pronaos could be seen from the central space of the basilica. Vitruvius's description of the shrine is otherwise rather unclear, and it is on this point that the various reconstructions differ most.

== Interpretations and reconstructions ==
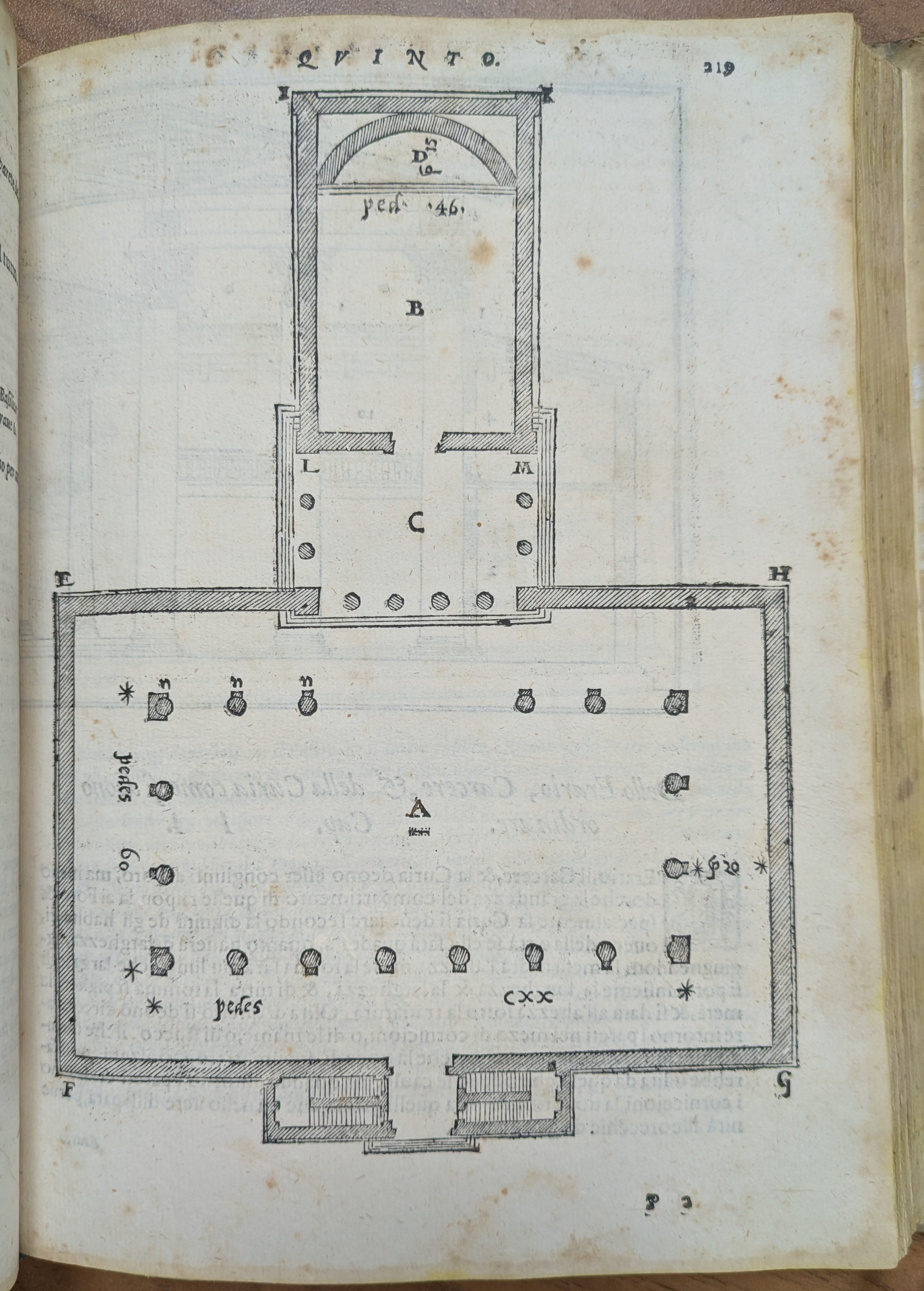
Reconstruction by Andrea Palladio (1584)

Attempts to reconstruct the building on the basis of Vitruvius's description have been made since the 16th century, and reconstruction drawings were included in successive editions and translations of De architectura, among them those of Cesare Cesariano (1521) and the plan drawn by Andrea Palladio for Daniele Barbaro's edition.

Among the earliest reconstructions is that of Fra Giocondo, editor of the first illustrated edition of Vitruvius in 1511. Giocondo's representation, set against the detailed description of the elevation in the Vitruvian text, is limited to the plan: the basilica is shown as a rectangle with a length-to-width ratio of 2:1, with an external peristasis of four columns on the short sides, eight on the long north side and six on the long south side. The long side was to have an opening on the axis of the aedes Augusti, which Giocondo interpreted as a separate building, a true rectangular temple with an external peristasis of columns on all four sides (figure "c" on folio 46v). The tribunal is placed on a podium raised on two steps within a semicircular apse, located however against the rear wall on the short side of the basilica, although Vitruvius describes it on the long side. The relocation of the tribunal from the long to the short side was probably a conscious choice by the friar, who writes in the caption to the woodcut that he did not share the arrangement proposed by the Latin author.

In his Commentaries, Daniele Barbaro proposed a solution closer to the Vitruvian description, with a central peristasis in a 1:2 ratio of width to length, surrounded by a portico 20 feet deep and with a semicircular tribunal set into the long side and preceded by a pronaos.

== Sant'Agostino archaeological area ==
Opposite the church of Sant'Agostino in Fano, a masonry aedicula gives access to the staircase leading down to the ancient Roman building complex on which the church and convent rest. The identification of these remains, which stood in the center of the ancient city, remains difficult, but they have been supposed to belong either to the Temple of Fortuna or, as traditionally claimed, to the Basilica of Vitruvius. The remains comprise a long wall of small stone blocks punctuated by pilasters and windows, small fan-shaped arches, a wall with an apse, columns and drainage channels.

== Rediscovery ==
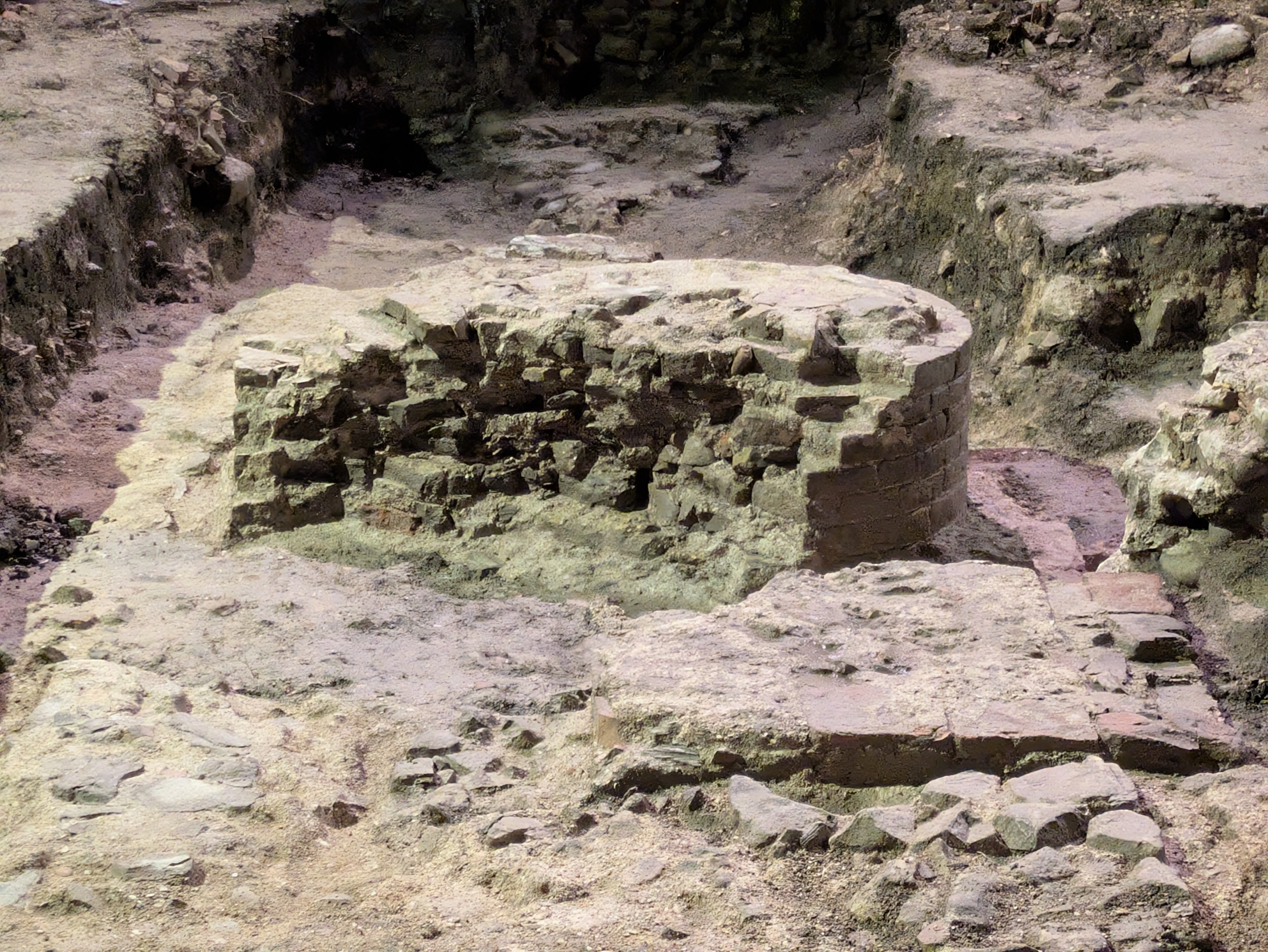
Base of a column of the basilica (2025)

The first remains later connected with the basilica came to light in 2022 during redevelopment works in Fano. In March 2023 the Italian press reported the emergence of structures that were tentatively linked to the building. On 19 January 2026, following archaeological excavations in Piazza Andrea Costa, the discovery of the remains of the civic basilica described by Vitruvius in De architectura was formally announced at a press conference at the Mediateca Montanari, attended by video link by the Italian Minister of Culture, Alessandro Giuli. International coverage compared the find, described as the only surviving work of the "father of architecture", to the discovery of the tomb of Tutankhamun.

In the excavations, which are still in progress, large portions of the foundations and of the preparatory architectural layers of the basilica have been uncovered beneath Piazza Andrea Costa, together with some evidence of the marble flooring and of the standing masonry.

== See also ==
- Vitruvius
- De architectura
- Basilica

== Bibliography ==
- Vitruvius, De architectura, Book V.
- F. Pellati, "La basilica vitruviana di Fano", in Atti dell'undicesimo congresso di storia dell'architettura, Rome, 1965, pp. 95–99.
- Vitruvio, De architectura, edited by P. Gros, translation and commentary by A. Corso and E. Romano, I–II, Turin, 1997, II, p. 643.
- C. Saliou, Vitruve: De l'architecture. Livre V, Paris, 2009, p. 141.
- F. Salatin, "La basilica di Fano. Giocondo, Palladio e il Vitruvio ferrarese", in Annali di architettura, 24, 2012.
