= Giacomo Andrea da Ferrara =

Italian architect

Giacomo Andrea da Ferrara (also known as Iacomo Andrea; died 12 May 1500) was an architect from Ferrara and the author on a commentary on Vitruvius. Very little is known about him; his name did not appear on any buildings in Milan.

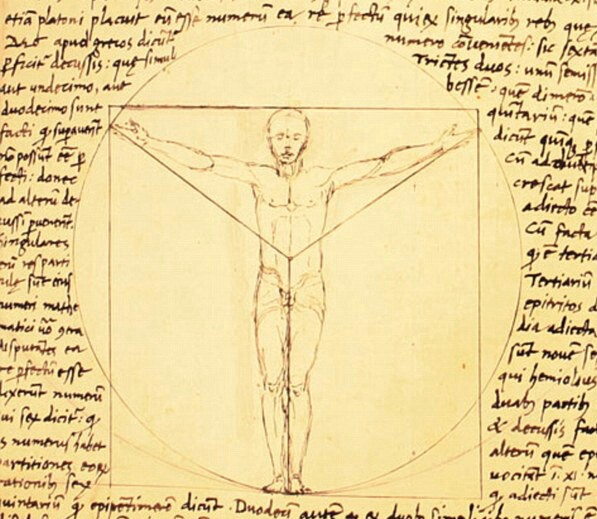
A Vitruvian Man prototype by Giacomo Andrea, 1480s

Luca Pacioli wrote that Giacomo Andrea was almost like a brother to Leonardo da Vinci. Giacomo Andrea, active by the 1480s, drew a prototypical Vitruvian Man which may have served as the basis for Leonardo's drawing, or may have been conceived alongside it as a collaborative effort.

Giacomo Andrea was very loyal to the Sforza family. After the occupation of Milan by the French, he is said to have plotted against the French. He was put on trial and sentenced to death. Archbishop Pallavicini attempted to plead for his innocence. Giacomo Andrea was publicly beheaded on 12 May 1500. His body was quartered and placed on four different gates of the city. Leonardo da Vinci did not plot against the French, but instead went into their service.
