= Cesare Cesariano =

Italian painter

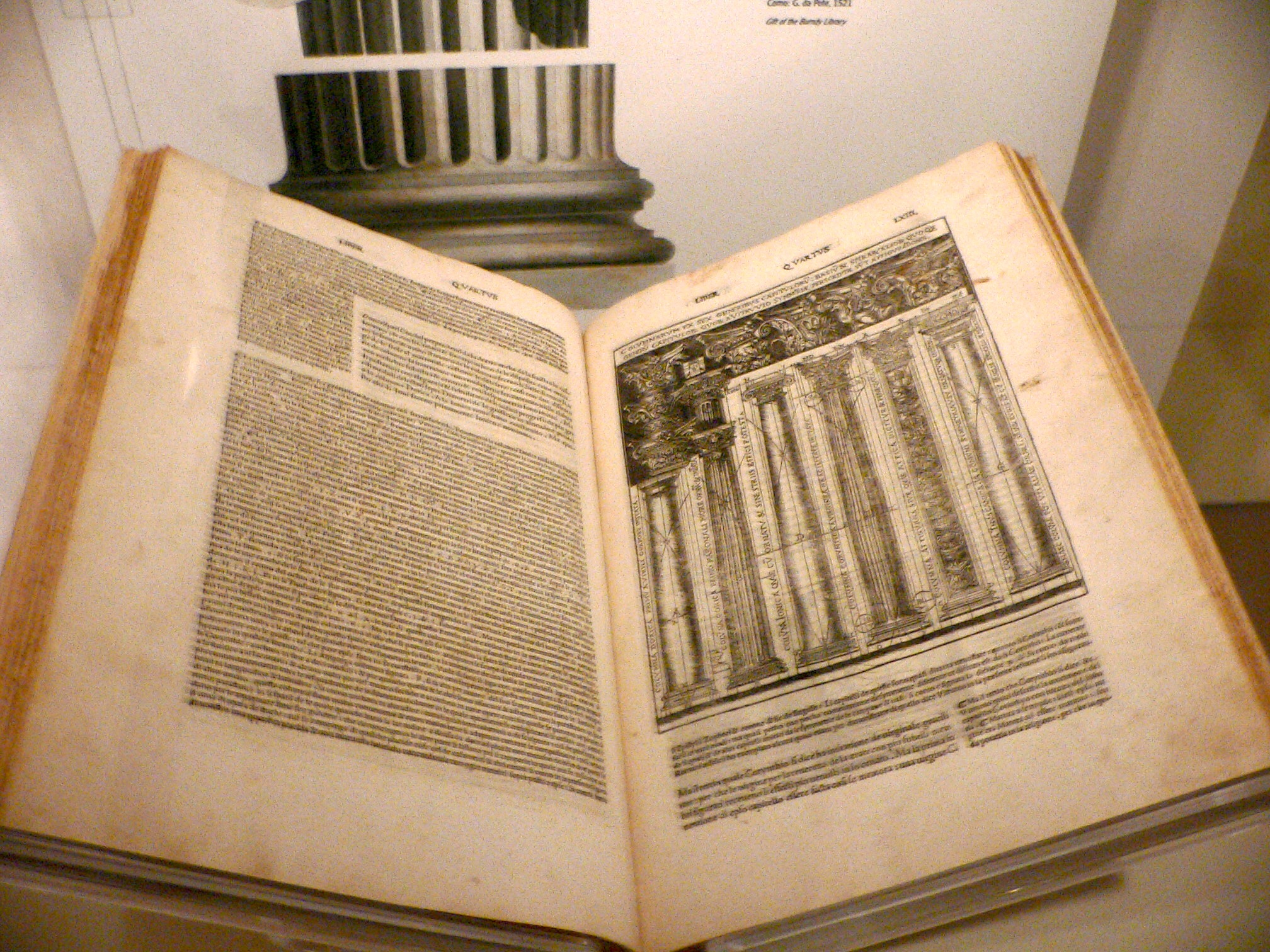
The 1521 Italian edition of Vitruvius' De architectura, translated and illustrated by Cesare Cesariano.

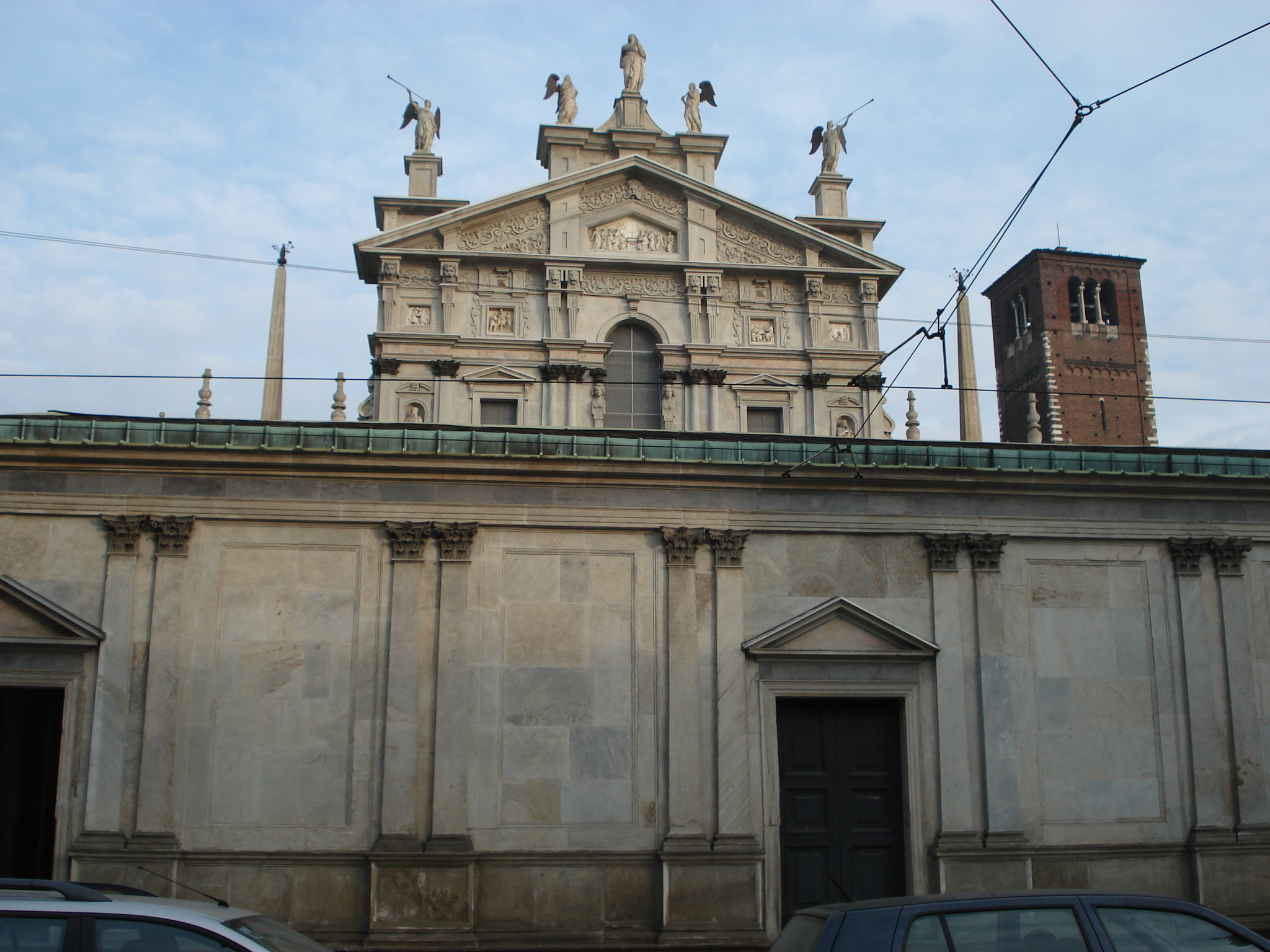
Pronaos of the church of Santa Maria presso San Celso, attributed to Cesare Cesariano.

Cesare di Lorenzo Cesariano (December 10, 1475 – March 30, 1543) was an Italian painter, architect and architectural theorist. He authored the first Italian-language version of Vitruvius' De architectura.

== Biography ==
Cesariano was born in Milan. Information about his life is scarce. In 1496 he lived for a period at Reggio Emilia; in the early 1500s he worked at Parma, where he painted the sacristy of San Giovanni Evangelista. In 1507 he was in Rome, where he met Perugino, Pinturicchio and Luca Signorelli.

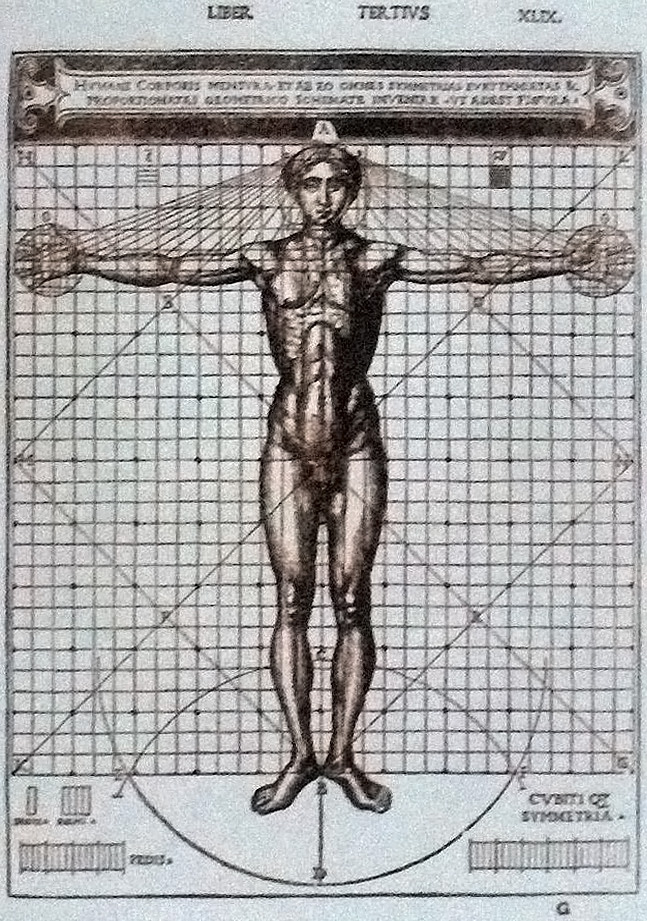
"Vitruvian Man", illustration in the edition of Vitruvius' De Architectura by Cesare Cesariano (1521)

However, most of his activity was in Milan, where he returned in 1512-1513 as military engineer at Maximilian Sforza's court. He worked at Santa Maria presso San Celso and to part of the renovation of the Sforza Castle; he collaborated in the painting decoration of Milan Cathedral (Duomo), in the Sala dei Deputati, which was demolished in the 19th century. Giorgio Vasari wrote in Bramante's vita:

Determined to see at least one notable thing, he proceeded to Milan to visit the Duomo, where there happened to be one Cesare Cesariano, reputed a good geometer and architect, who had written a commentary on Vitruvius. Enraged at not having received the reward which he had expected, Cesare refused to work any more, and, becoming eccentric, he died more like a beast than a man.

In 1528 Cesariano was appointed as ducal engineer by the Spanish governor of Milan. In 1535 he became director of construction in the Duomo.

== Works ==
Cesariano is chiefly remembered as the first translator of Vitruvius' treatise De architectura into a modern language (Italian), with his added commentary. It was published, with copious woodcut illustrations, at Como, 1521. It contained 360 pages and was printed in 1300 copies. It was soon plagiarized in editions published at Venice, but all were superseded by Daniele Barbaro's edition, with illustrations by Andrea Palladio, 1556.

Vitruvius' technical language is fraught with difficulties. Leon Battista Alberti was of the mind that the Latins thought Vitruvius was writing Greek and the Greeks, Latin. The impenetrable Latin and the lack of illustrations gave freedom to the Renaissance designers, who were able to interpret antique architecture in their own image, all' antica. Cesariano's Vitruvius gives us a clear picture of the Renaissance perception of the architecture of Classical Antiquity. Indeed, the spirit of Milan's Late Gothic Duomo can be recognized in some of Cesariano's woodcuts . Among his illustrations is an attempt at rendering Vitruvius' precepts on the ideally proportioned man, successfully rendered by Leonardo, but attempted by many 15th century theorists

Cesariano's illustrations, though not as influential as Sebastiano Serlio's, had some influence in the picturesque and classicizing vocabulary of the Northern Antwerp Mannerism.
