= De architectura =

Treatise on architecture by Vitruvius

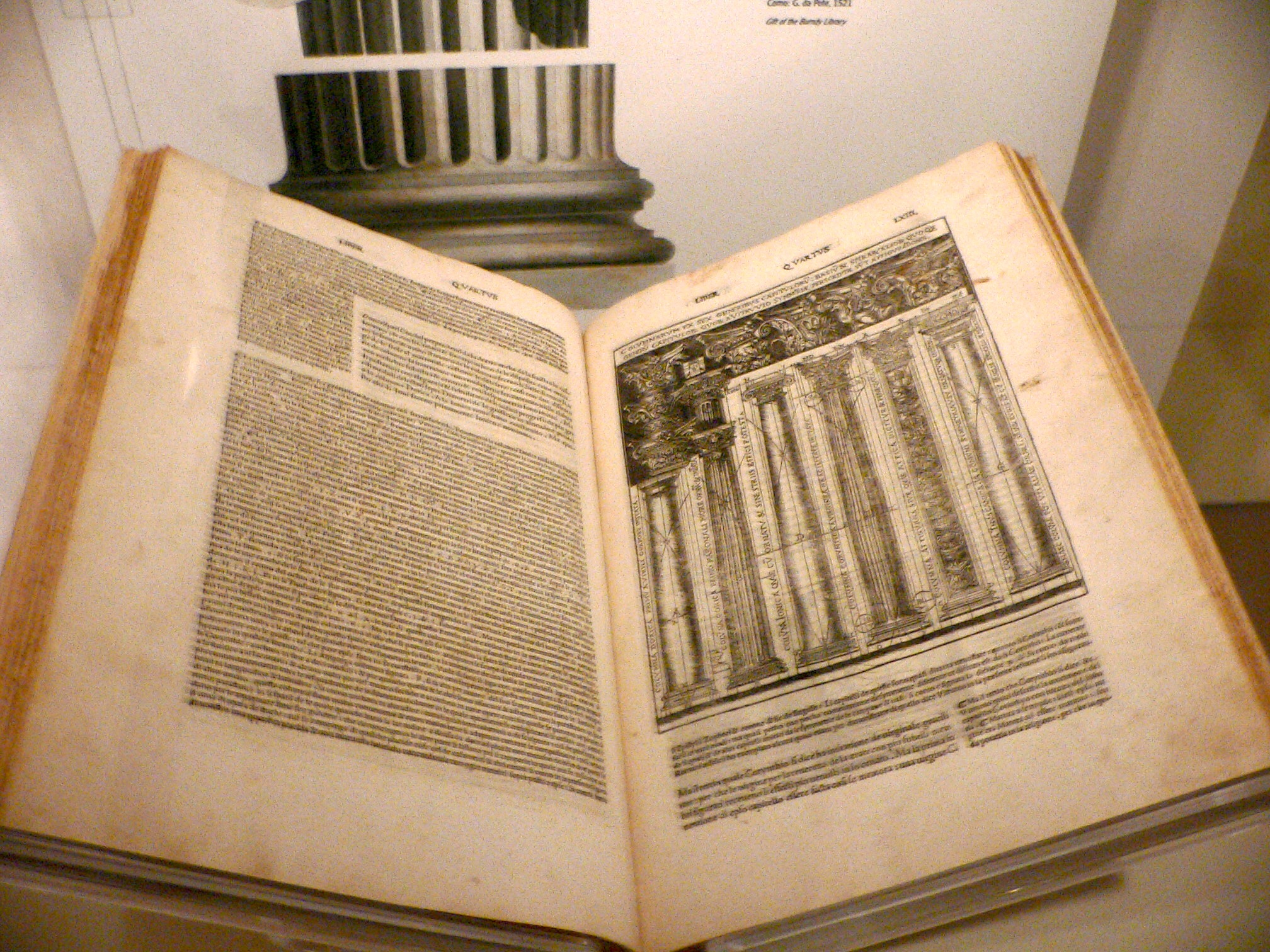
A 1521 Italian language edition of De architectura, translated and illustrated by Cesare Cesariano

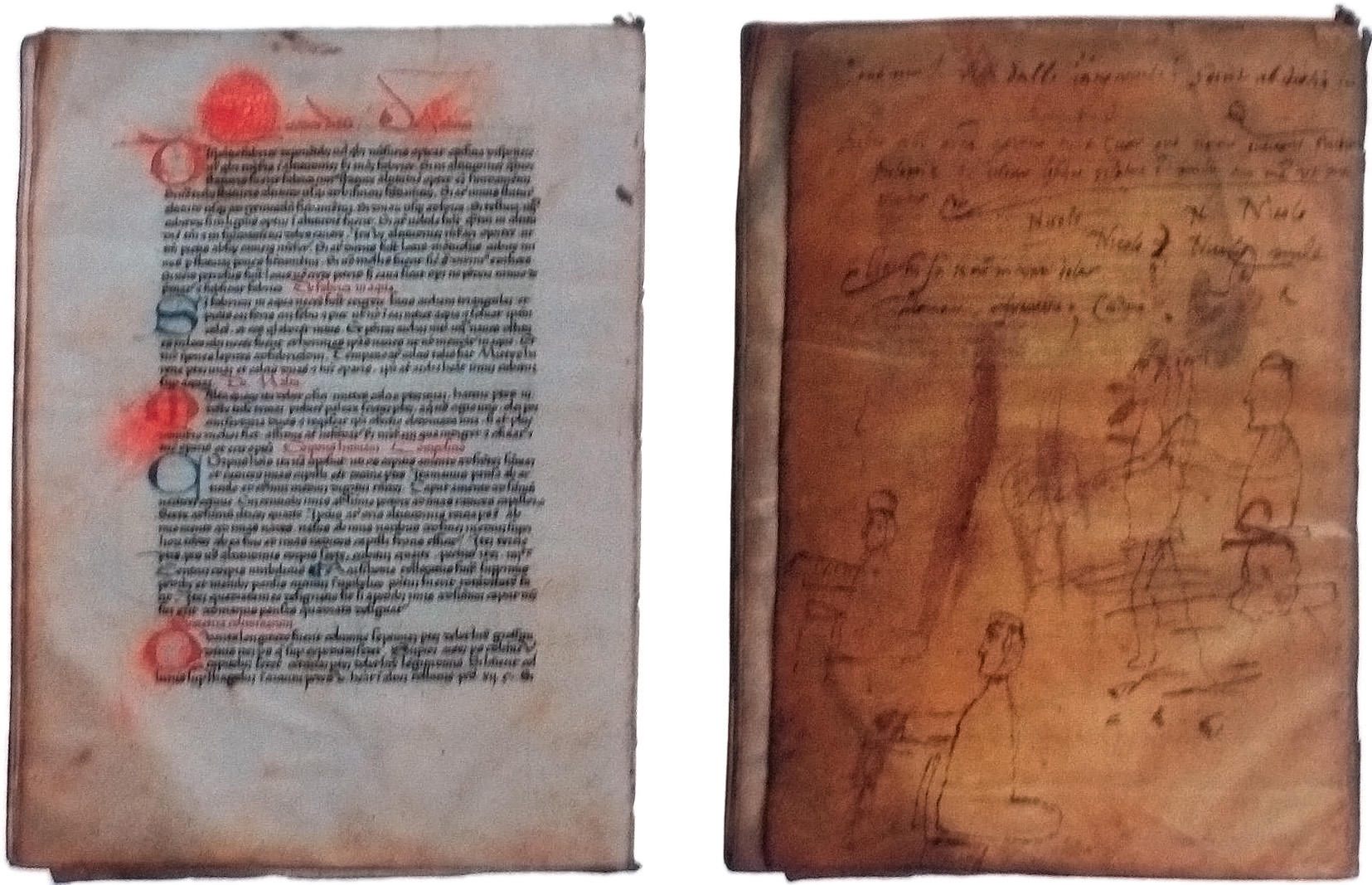
Manuscript of Vitruvius; parchment dating from about 1390

De architectura (On architecture, published as Ten Books on Architecture) is a treatise on architecture written by the Roman architect and military engineer Vitruvius and dedicated to his patron, the emperor Caesar Augustus, as a guide for building projects. As the only treatise on architecture to survive from antiquity, it has been regarded since the Renaissance as the first known book on architectural theory, as well as a major source on the canon of classical architecture.

It contains a variety of information on Greek and Roman buildings, as well as prescriptions for the planning and design of military camps, cities, and structures both large (aqueducts, buildings, baths, harbours) and small (machines, measuring devices, instruments). Since Vitruvius wrote early in the Roman architectural revolution that saw the full development of cross vaulting, domes, concrete, and other innovations associated with Imperial Roman architecture, his ten books give little information on these distinctive innovations of Roman building design and technology.

From references to them in the text, it is known that there were at least a few illustrations in original copies (perhaps eight or ten), but perhaps only one of these survived in any medieval manuscript copy. This deficiency was remedied in 16th-century printed editions, which became illustrated with many large plates.

Copies were made during the Carolingian Renaissance, but little use was made of them until the 15th century, when the work became of great interest and influence, initially in Italy and then in the rest of Europe.

== Origin and contents ==
Probably written between 30 and 20 BC, it combines the knowledge and views of many antique writers, Greek and Roman, on architecture, the arts, natural history and building technology. Vitruvius cites many authorities throughout the text, often praising Greek architects for their development of temple building and the orders (Doric, Ionic and Corinthian), and providing key accounts of the origins of building in the primitive hut.

The Roman author gives advice on the qualifications of an architect (Book I) and on types of architectural drawing.

Though often cited for his famous "triad" of characteristics associated with architecture – utilitas, firmitas and venustas (utility, strength and beauty) – the aesthetic principles that influenced later treatise writers were outlined in Book III. Derived partially from Latin rhetoric (through Cicero and Varro), Vitruvian terms for order, arrangement, proportion, and fitness for intended purposes have guided architects for centuries, and continue to do so.

The ten books or scrolls are organized as follows:

De architectura (Ten Books on Architecture)

1. Town planning, architecture or civil engineering in general, and the qualifications required of an architect or the civil engineer
2. Building materials
3. Temples and the orders of architecture (includes the section on body proportions that led to da Vinci's drawing)
4. continuation of book III
5. Civil buildings
6. Domestic buildings
7. Pavements and decorative plasterwork
8. Water supplies and aqueducts
9. Sciences influencing architecture – geometry, measurement, astronomy, sundial
10. Use and construction of machines – Roman siege engines, water mills, drainage machines, Roman technology, hoisting, pneumatics

Roman architects were skilled in engineering, art, and craftsmanship combined. Vitruvius was very much of this type, a fact reflected in De architectura. He covered a wide variety of subjects he saw as touching on architecture. This included many aspects that may seem irrelevant to modern eyes, ranging from mathematics to astronomy, meteorology, and medicine. In the Roman conception, architecture needed to take into account everything touching on the physical and intellectual life of man and his surroundings.

Vitruvius, thus, deals with many theoretical issues concerning architecture. For instance, in Book II of De architectura, he advises architects working with bricks to familiarise themselves with pre-Socratic theories of matter so as to understand how their materials will behave. Book IX relates the abstract geometry of Plato to the everyday work of the surveyor. Astrology is cited for its insights into the organisation of human life, while astronomy is required for the understanding of sundials. Likewise, Vitruvius cites Ctesibius of Alexandria and Archimedes for their inventions, Aristoxenus (Aristotle's apprentice) for music, Agatharchus for theatre, and Varro for architecture.

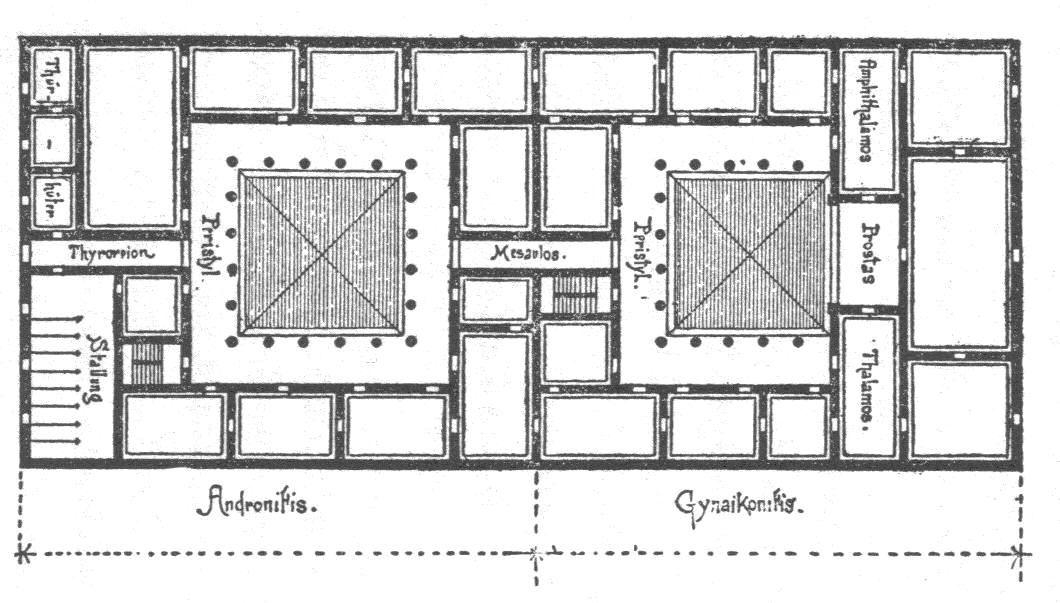
Greek house plan after Vitruvius

=== Buildings ===
Vitruvius sought to address the ethos of architecture, declaring that quality depends on the social relevance of the artist's work, not on the form or workmanship of the work itself. Perhaps the most famous declaration from De architectura is one still quoted by architects: "Well building hath three conditions: firmness, commodity, and delight". This quote is taken from Sir Henry Wotton's version of 1624, and accurately translates the passage in the work, (I.iii.2) but English has changed since then, especially in regard to the word "commodity", and the tag may be misunderstood. In modern English it would read: "The ideal building has three elements; it is sturdy, useful, and beautiful."

Vitruvius also studied human proportions (Book III) and this part of his canones were later adopted and adapted in the famous drawing Homo Vitruvianus ("Vitruvian Man") by Leonardo da Vinci.

=== Domestic architecture ===
While Vitruvius is fulsome in his descriptions of religious buildings, infrastructure and machinery, he gives a mixed message on domestic architecture. Similar to Aristotle, Vitruvius offers admiration for householders who built their own homes without the involvement of an architect. His ambivalence on domestic architecture is most clearly read in the opening paragraph of the Introduction to Book 6. Book 6 focuses exclusively on residential architecture but as architectural theorist Simon Weir has explained, instead of writing the introduction on the virtues of residences or the family or some theme related directly to domestic life; Vitruvius writes an anecdote about the Greek ethical principle of xenia: showing kindness to strangers.

== Roman technology ==
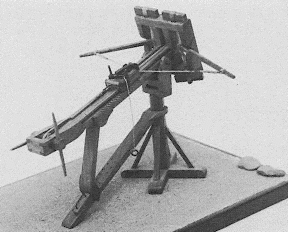
A Roman ballista

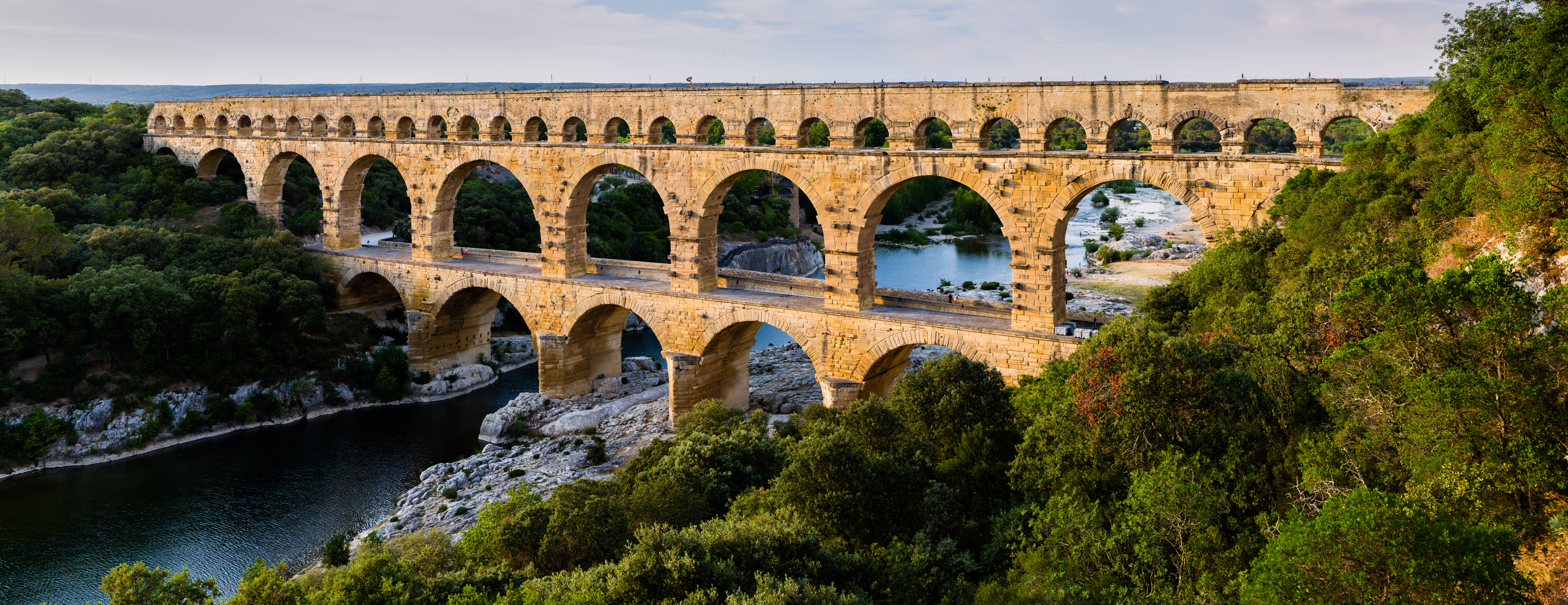
The Pont du Gard Roman aqueduct in southern France

De architectura is important for its descriptions of many different machines used for engineering structures, such as hoists, cranes, and pulleys, as well as war machines such as catapults, ballistae, and siege engines. Vitruvius also described the construction of sundials and water clocks, and the use of an aeolipile (the first steam engine) as an experiment to demonstrate the nature of atmospheric air movements (wind).

=== Aqueducts and mills ===
Books VIII, IX, and X of De architectura form the basis of much of what is known about Roman technology, now augmented by archaeological studies of extant remains, such as the Pont du Gard in southern France. Numerous such massive structures occur across the former empire, a testament to the power of Roman engineering. Vitruvius's description of Roman aqueduct construction is short, but mentions key details especially for the way they were surveyed, and the careful choice of materials needed.

His book would have been of assistance to Frontinus, a general who was appointed in the late 1st century AD to administer the many aqueducts of Rome. Frontinus wrote De aquaeductu, the definitive treatise on 1st-century Roman aqueducts, and discovered a discrepancy between the intake and supply of water caused by illegal pipes inserted into the channels to divert the water. The Roman Empire went far in exploiting water power, as the set of no fewer than 16 water mills at Barbegal in France demonstrates. The mills ground grain in a very efficient operation, and many other mills are now known, such as the much later Hierapolis sawmill.

=== Materials ===
Vitruvius described many different construction materials used for a wide variety of different structures, as well as such details as stucco painting. Cement, concrete, and lime received in-depth descriptions, the longevity of many Roman structures being mute testimony to their skill in building materials and design.

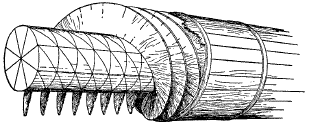
Design for an Archimedean water screw

He advised that lead should not be used to conduct drinking water, clay pipes being preferred. He comes to this conclusion in Book VIII of De architectura after empirical observation of the apparent laborer illnesses in the plumbum (lead pipe) foundries of his time. However, much of the water used by Rome and many other cities was very hard, minerals soon coated the inner surfaces of the pipes, so lead poisoning was reduced.

Vitruvius related the famous story about Archimedes and his detection of adulterated gold in a royal crown. When Archimedes realized the volume of the crown could be measured exactly by the displacement created in a bath of water, he ran into the street with the cry of "Eureka!", and the discovery enabled him to compare the density of the crown with pure gold. He showed the crown had been alloyed with silver, and the king was defrauded.

=== Dewatering machines ===
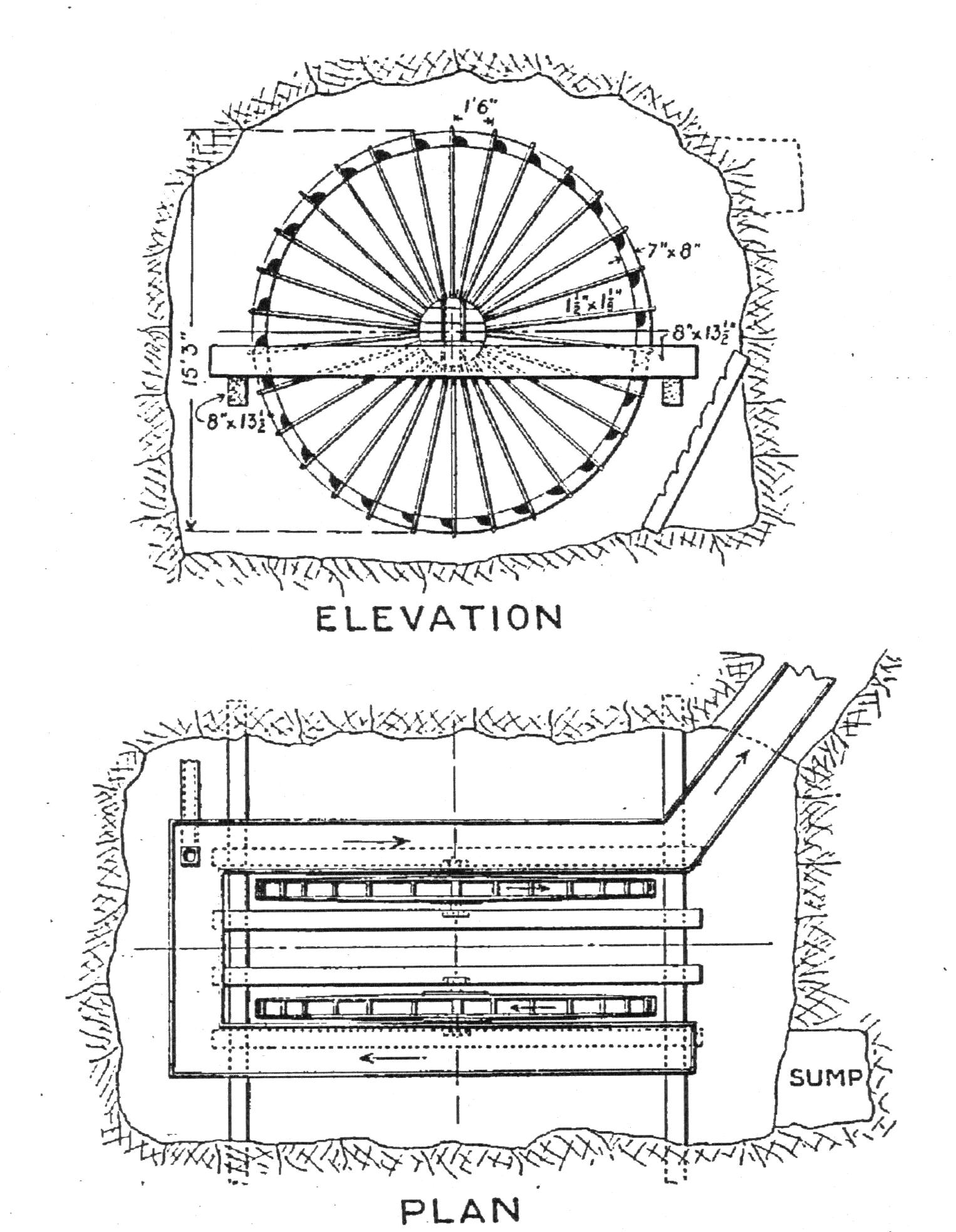
Drainage wheel from Rio Tinto mines

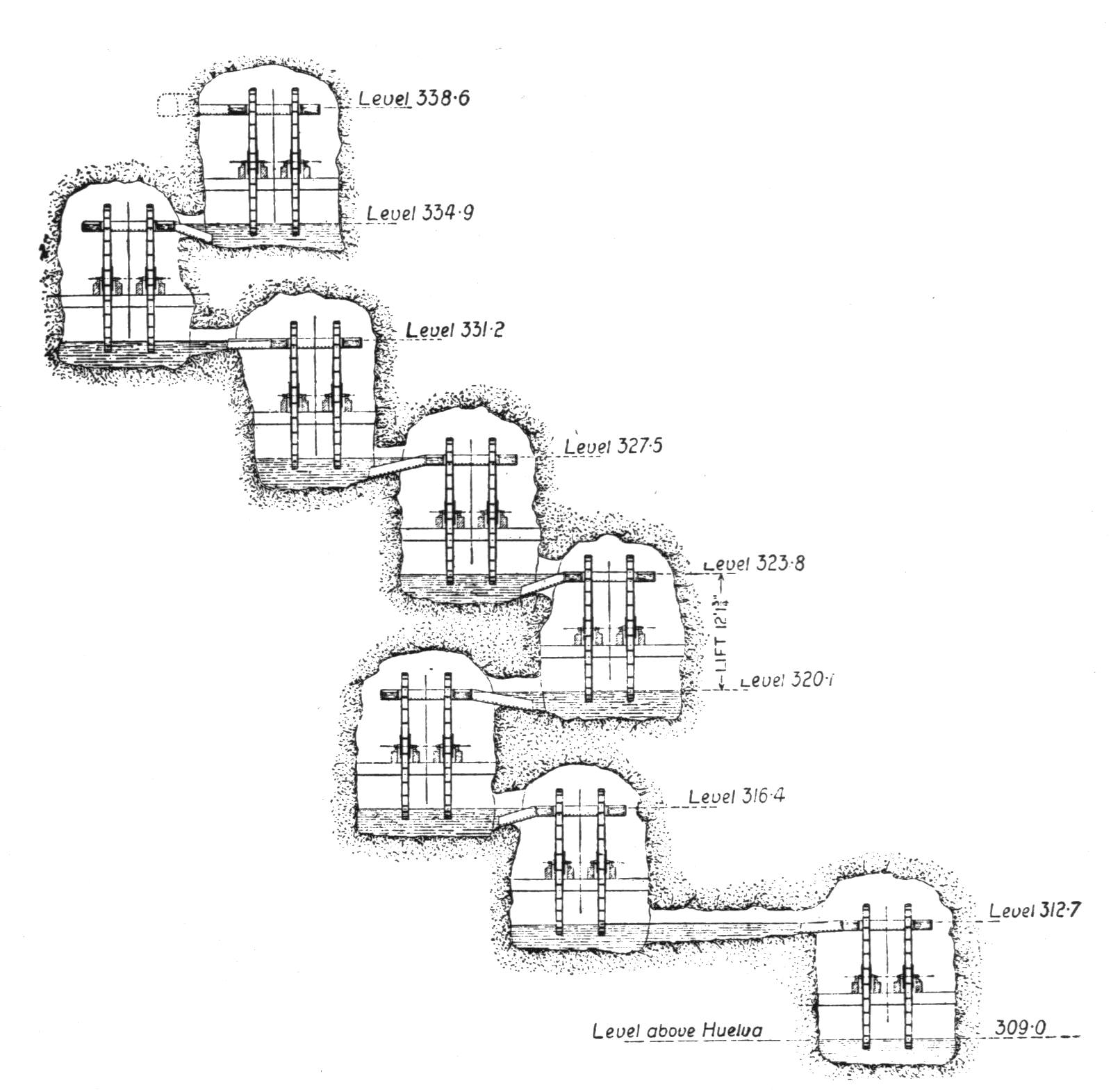
Sequence of drainage wheels found in Rio Tinto

Vitruvius described the construction of the Archimedes' screw in Chapter 10, although did not mention Archimedes by name. It was a device widely used for raising water to irrigate fields and dewater mines. Other lifting machines mentioned in De architectura include the endless chain of buckets and the reverse overshot water-wheel. Remains of the water wheels used for lifting water have been discovered in old mines such as those at Rio Tinto in Spain and Dolaucothi in west Wales. One of the wheels from Rio Tinto is now in the British Museum, and one from the latter in the National Museum of Wales. The remains were discovered when these mines were reopened in modern mining attempts. They would have been used in a vertical sequence, with 16 such mills capable of raising water at least 96 feet (29 m) above the water table. Each wheel would have been worked by a miner treading the device at the top of the wheel, by using cleats on the outer edge. That they were using such devices in mines clearly implies that they were entirely capable of using them as water wheels to develop power for a range of activities, not just for grinding wheat, but also probably for sawing timber, crushing ores, fulling, and so on.

=== Force pump ===
Ctesibius is credited with the invention of the force pump, which Vitruvius described as being built from bronze with valves to allow a head of water to be formed above the machine. The device is also described by Hero of Alexandria in his Pneumatica. The machine is operated by hand in moving a lever up and down. He mentioned its use for supplying fountains above a reservoir, although a more mundane use might be as a simple fire engine. One was found at Calleva Atrebatum (Roman Silchester) in England, and another is on display at the British Museum. Their functions are not described, but they are both made in bronze, just as Vitruvius specified.

Vitruvius also mentioned the several automatons Ctesibius invented, and intended for amusement and pleasure rather than serving a useful function.

=== Central heating ===
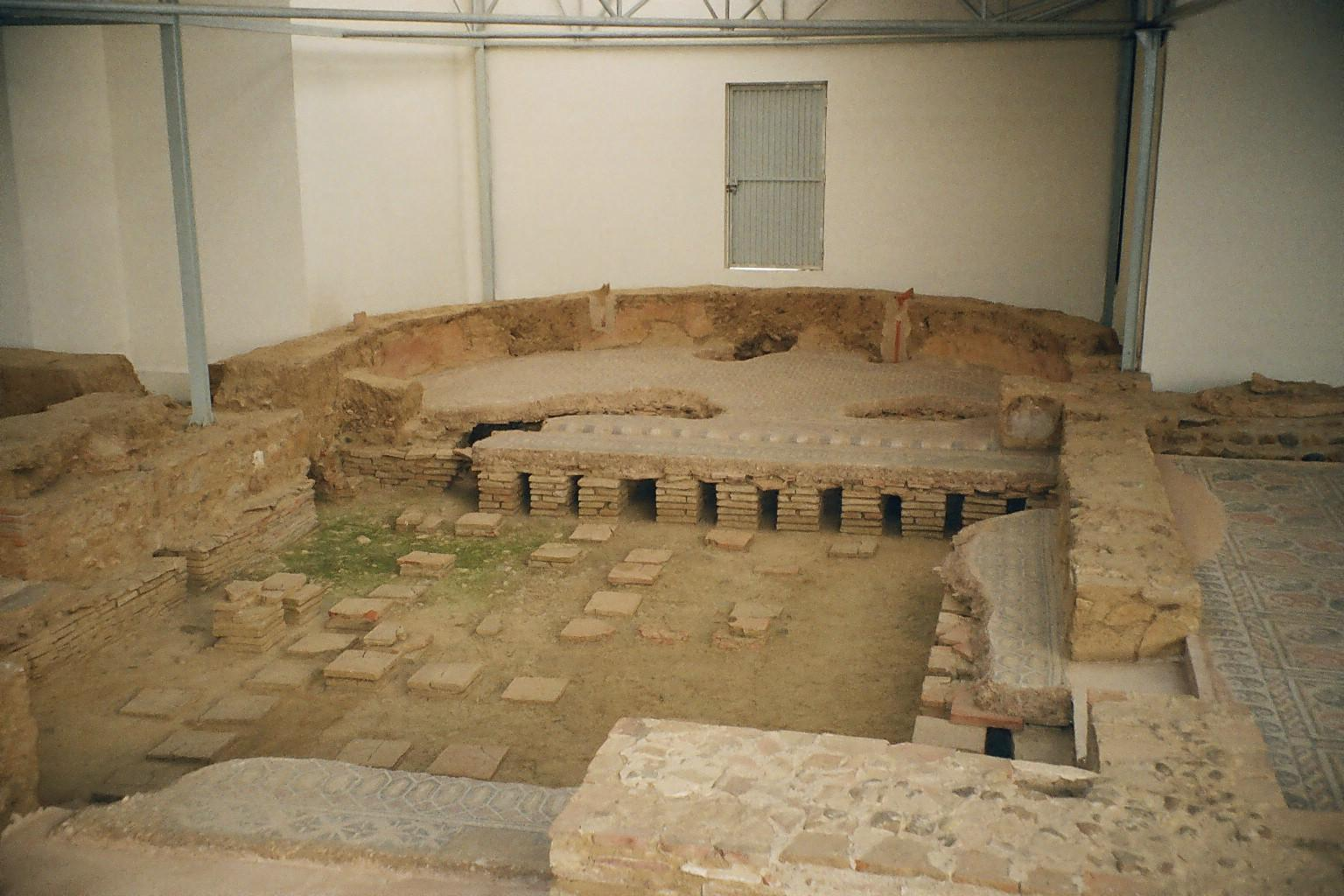
Ruins of the hypocaust under the floor of a Roman villa: The part under the exedra is covered.

Vitruvius outlined the many innovations made in building design to improve the living conditions of the inhabitants. Foremost among them is the development of the hypocaust, a type of central heating where hot air developed by a fire was channelled under the floor and inside the walls of public baths and villas. He gave explicit instructions on how to design such buildings so fuel efficiency is maximized; for example, the caldarium is next to the tepidarium followed by the frigidarium. He also advised using a type of regulator to control the heat in the hot rooms, a bronze disc set into the roof under a circular aperture, which could be raised or lowered by a pulley to adjust the ventilation. Although he did not suggest it himself, his dewatering devices such as the reverse overshot water-wheel likely were used in the larger baths to lift water to header tanks at the top of the larger thermae, such as the Baths of Diocletian and the Baths of Caracalla.

=== Surveying instruments ===
That Vitruvius must have been well practised in surveying is shown by his descriptions of surveying instruments, especially the water level or chorobates, which he compared favourably with the groma, a device using plumb lines. They were essential in all building operations, but especially in aqueduct construction, where a uniform gradient was important to provision of a regular supply of water without damage to the walls of the channel. He described the hodometer, in essence a device for automatically measuring distances along roads, a machine essential for developing accurate itineraries, such as the Peutinger Table.

=== Sea level change ===
In Book IV Chapter 1 Subsection 4 of De architectura is a description of 13 Athenian cities in Asia Minor, "the land of Caria", in present-day Turkey. These cities are given as: Ephesus, Miletus, Myus, Priene, Samos, Teos, Colophon, Chius, Erythrae, Phocaea, Clazomenae, Lebedos, Mytilene, and later a 14th, Smyrnaeans. Myus, the third city, is described as being "long ago engulfed by the water, and its sacred rites and suffrage". This sentence indicates, at the time of Vitruvius's writing, it was known that sea-level change and/or land subsidence occurred. The layout of these cities is in general from south to north so that it appears that where Myrus should be located is inland. If this is the case, then since the writing of De architectura, the region has experienced either soil rebound or a sea-level fall. Though not indicative of sea-level change, or speculation of such, during the later-empire many Roman ports suffered from what contemporary writers described as 'silting'. The constant need to dredge ports became a heavy burden on the treasury and some have speculated that this expense significantly contributed to the eventual collapse of the empire. Roman salt works in Essex, England, today are located at the five-metre contour, implying this was the coastline. These observations only indicate the extent of silting and soil rebound affecting coastline change since the writing of De architectura.

== Survival and rediscovery ==
=== Manuscripts ===
Vitruvius's work is one of many examples of Latin texts that owe their survival to the palace scriptorium of Charlemagne in the early 9th century. This activity of finding and recopying classical manuscripts is part of what is called the Carolingian Renaissance. The London Vitruvius (British Library, Harley 2767), the oldest surviving manuscript, includes only one of the original illustrations, a rather crudely drawn octagonal wind rose in the margin. This was written in Germany in about 800 to 825, probably at the abbey of Saint Pantaleon, Cologne, and has been shown to be one of the most important manuscripts for the further transmission of the text.

These texts were not just copied, but also known at the court of Charlemagne, since his historian, bishop Einhard, asked the visiting English churchman Alcuin for explanations of some technical terms. In addition, a number of individuals are known to have read the text or have been indirectly influenced by it, including: Vussin, Hrabanus Maurus, Hermann of Reichenau, Hugo of St. Victor, Gervase of Melkley, William of Malmesbury, Theodoric of Sint-Truiden, Petrus Diaconus, Albertus Magnus, Filippo Villani, Jean de Montreuil, Petrarch, Boccaccio, Giovanni de Dondi, Domenico Bandini, Niccolò Acciaioli bequeathed copy to the Basilica of San Lorenzo, Florence, Bernward of Hildesheim, and Thomas Aquinas. In 1244 the Dominican friar Vincent of Beauvais made a large number of references to De architectura in his compendium of all the knowledge of the Middle Ages Speculum Maius

Many copies of De architectura, dating from the 8th to the 15th centuries, did exist in manuscript form during the Middle Ages and 92 are still available in public collections, but they appear to have received little attention, possibly due to the obsolescence of many specialized Latin terms used by Vitruvius and the loss of most of the original 10 illustrations thought by some to be helpful in understanding parts of the text.

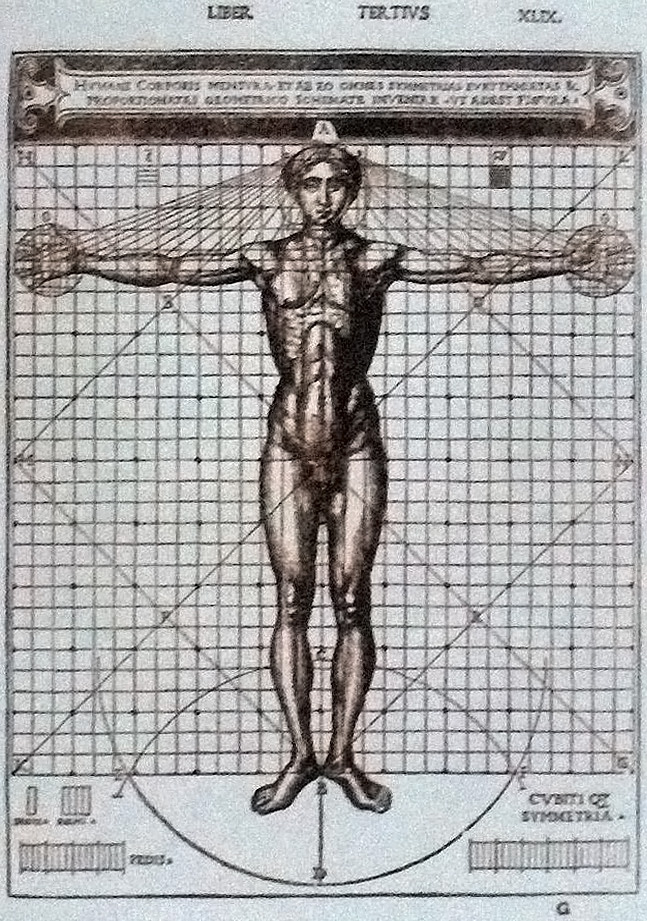
Vitruvian Man, illustration in the edition of De architectura by Vitruvius; illustrated edition by Cesare Cesariano (1521)

Vitruvius's work was "rediscovered" in 1416 by the Florentine humanist Poggio Bracciolini, who found it in the Abbey library of Saint Gall, Switzerland. He publicized the manuscript to a receptive audience of Renaissance thinkers, just as interest in the classical cultural and scientific heritage was reviving.

=== Printed editions ===
The first printed edition (editio princeps), an incunabulum version, was published by the Veronese scholar Fra Giovanni Sulpitius in 1486 (with a second edition in 1495 or 1496), but none were illustrated. The Dominican friar Fra Giovanni Giocondo produced the first version illustrated with woodcuts in Venice in 1511. It had a thorough philosophical approach and superb illustrations.

Translations into Italian were in circulation by the 1520s, the first in print being the translation with new illustrations by Cesare Cesariano, a Milanese friend of the architect Bramante, printed in Como in 1521.

In 1542 the Accademia della Virtù was formed in Rome under the patronage of Marcello Cervini to prepare a new annotated edition of De architectura. They met twice a week to read and discuss Vitruvius in the context of ancient monuments..

It was rapidly translated into other European languages – the first French version was published in 1547 – and the first German version followed in 1548. The first Spanish translation was published in 1582 by Miguel de Urrea and Juan Gracian. The most authoritative and influential edition was publicized in French in 1673 by Claude Perrault, commissioned by Jean-Baptiste Colbert in 1664.

John Shute had drawn on the text as early as 1563 for his book The First and Chief Grounds of Architecture. Sir Henry Wotton's 1624 work The Elements of Architecture amounts to a heavily influenced adaptation, while a 1692 translation was much abridged. English-speakers had to wait until 1771 for a full translation of the first five volumes and 1791 for the entire work. Thanks to the art of printing, Vitruvius's work had become a popular subject of hermeneutics, with highly detailed and interpretive illustrations, and became widely dispersed.

Of the many later editions, the 1914 Ten Books on Architecture translated by Morris H. Morgan, Ph.D., LL.D. Late Professor of Classical Philology in Harvard University, is fully available at Project Gutenberg, and from the Internet Archive.

== Impact ==
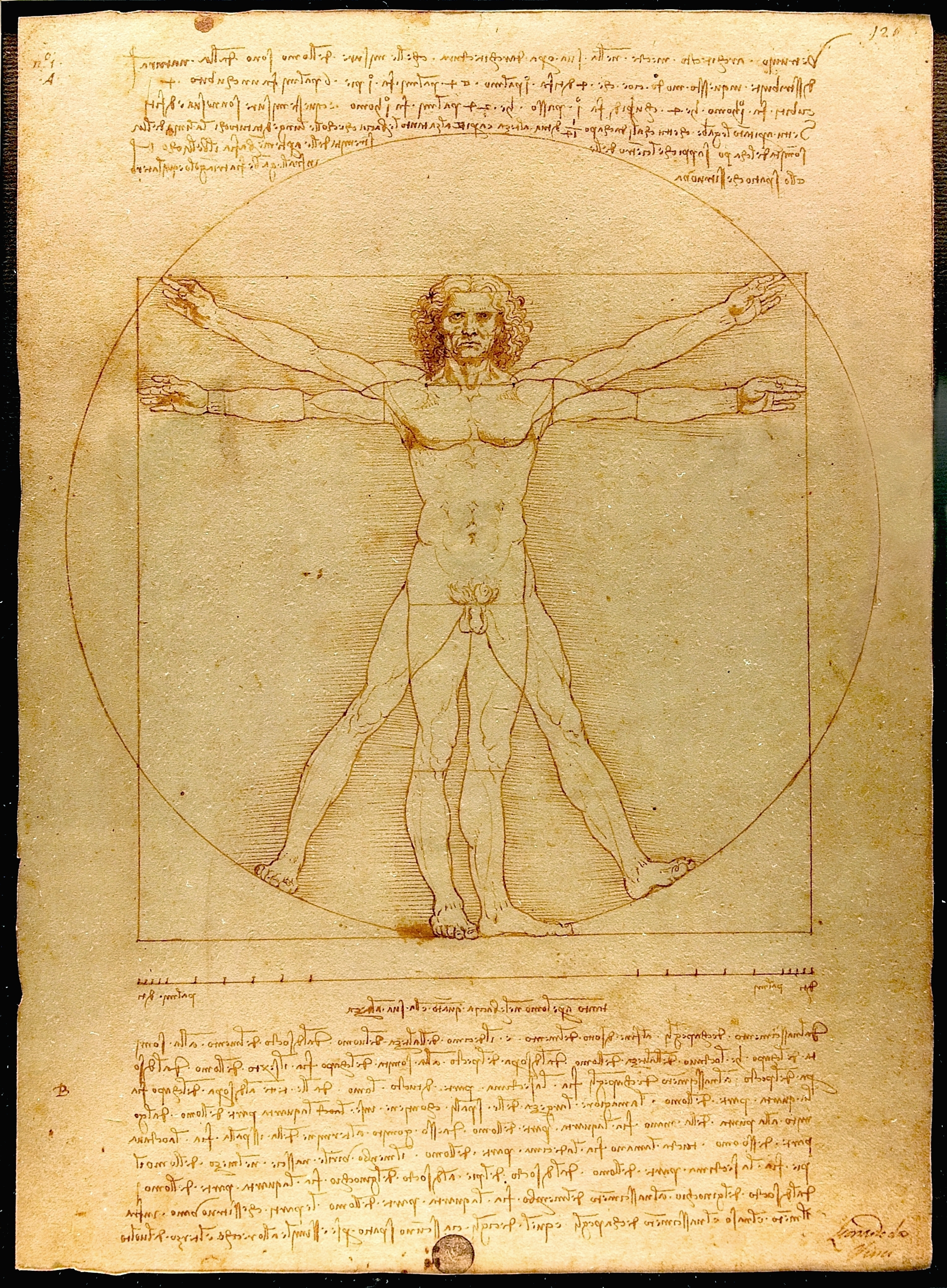
Vitruvian Man, Leonardo da Vinci (c. 1485–1490)

The rediscovery of Vitruvius's work had a profound influence on architects of the Renaissance, prompting the rebirth of Classical architecture in subsequent centuries. Renaissance architects, such as Niccoli, Brunelleschi and Leon Battista Alberti, found in De architectura their rationale for raising their branch of knowledge to a scientific discipline as well as emphasising the skills of the artisan. One of Leonardo da Vinci's best known drawings, the Vitruvian Man, is based on the principles of body proportions developed by Vitruvius in the first chapter of Book III, On Symmetry: In Temples And In The Human Body.

The English architect Inigo Jones and the Frenchman Salomon de Caus were among the first to re-evaluate and implement those disciplines that Vitruvius considered a necessary element of architecture: arts and sciences based upon number and proportion. The 16th-century architect Palladio considered Vitruvius his master and guide, and made some drawings based on his work before conceiving his own architectural precepts.

=== Astrolabe ===
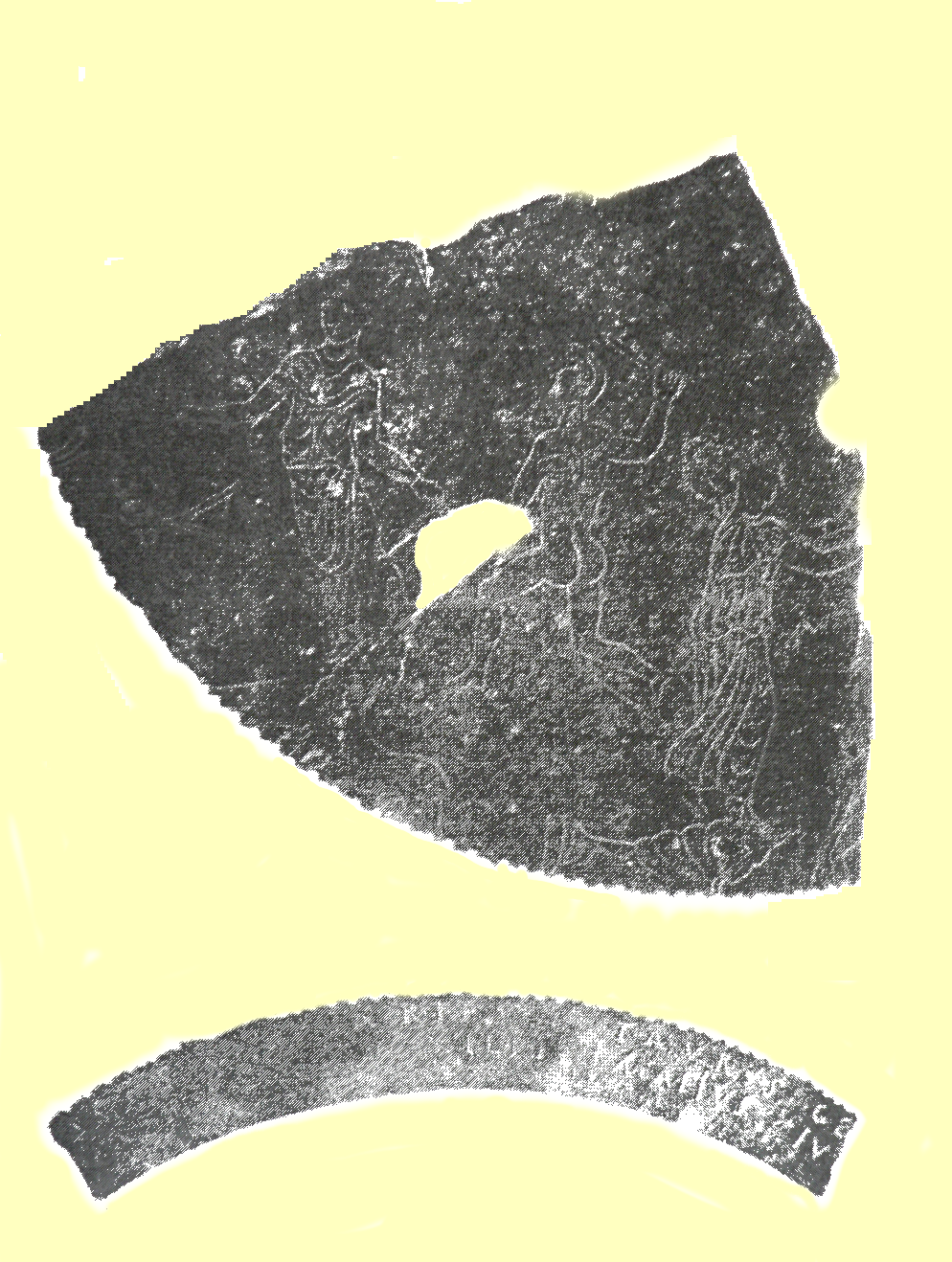
Fragment of an anaphoric clock found in Salzburg and corresponding to the description by Vitruvius

The earliest evidence of use of the stereographic projection in a machine is in De architectura, which describes an anaphoric clock (it is presumed, a clepsydra or water clock) in Alexandria. The clock had a rotating field of stars behind a wire frame indicating the hours of the day. The wire framework (the spider) and the star locations were constructed using the stereographic projection. Similar constructions dated from the 1st to 3rd centuries have been found in Salzburg and northeastern France, so such mechanisms were, it is presumed, fairly widespread among Romans.

== See also ==
- De re aedificatoria – Classic architectural treatise by Leon Battista Alberti
- I quattro libri dell'architettura – 1570 treatise on architecture by Andrea Palladio
- Pliny the Elder – Roman military commander and writer (AD23/24–79)
- Ancient Roman architecture
- Ancient Roman engineering – Engineering accomplishments of the ancient Roman civilization
- Ancient Roman technology – Technological accomplishments of the ancient Roman civilization
