= Liu Zhi =

Liu Zhi (Liu Chih in Wade–Giles) may refer to:

- Liu Zhi (prince) (劉祉), Eastern Han dynasty prince
- Liu Zhi (Boxian) (劉植; died 26), style name Boxian (伯先), Eastern Han dynasty general
- Emperor Huan of Han (132–168), name Liu Zhi (劉志), Eastern Han dynasty emperor
- Liu Zhi (historian) (劉秩), style name Zuoqing (柞卿), Tang dynasty historian
- Liu Yan (emperor) (889–942), emperor of Southern Han, also known as Liu Zhi
- Liu Zhi (poet) (劉植), style name Chengdao (成道), Song dynasty poet
- Liu Zhi (scholar) (劉智; 1660–1739), style name Jielian (介廉), Qing dynasty Hui Islamic scholar
- Liu Zhi (ROC) (劉峙; 1892–1971), Kuomintang military and political leader
- Liu Zhi (minister), CPC member and early minister of education
