= Tongdian =

Chinese encyclopedia

Volume 14 of the Tongdian

A page from volume 51 of Tongdian

The Tongdian (Chinese: 通典; Wade–Giles: T'ung-tien; lit. 'Comprehensive Institutions') is a Chinese institutional history and encyclopedia text. It covers a panoply of topics from high antiquity through the year 756, whereas a quarter of the book focuses on the Tang dynasty. The book was written by Du You from 766 to 801. It contains 200 volumes and about 1.7 million words, and is at times regarded as the most representative contemporary texts of the Tang dynasty. Du You also incorporated many materials from other sources, including a book written by his nephew, Du Huan, who was taken captive in the famous battle at the Talas River between Tang and the Arabs in 751 and did not return to China until ten years later. It became a model for works by scholar Zheng Qiao (Tongzhi) and Ma Duanlin (Wenxian Tongkao or shortened as Tongkao) centuries later.

Robert G. Hoyland relates that the Tongdian's first draft was a "history of human institutions from earliest times down to the reign of Emperor Xuanzong of Tang", and was subsequently revised as matters continued to evolve. It incorporates parts of the Zhengdian of Liu Zhi and the Great Tang Ritual Regulations of the Kaiyuan Era compiled by Xiao Song, and others in 732. The Tongdian was never included in the canon of the Twenty-Four Histories. It was however quoted extensively in several books which were, starting with the Old Book of Tang.

== Content ==
1. 食貨典 Food and commodity
2. 選舉典 Examination and advancement
3. 職官典 Government offices
4. 禮典 Rites
5. 樂典 Music
6. 兵典 Military
7. 刑法典 Penal law
8. 州郡典 Local administration
9. 邊防典 Border defense

== Size ==
The Tongdian was a towering literary undertaking for its time, and it is noted for its colossal size. The recent 2016 re-printed edition of Tongdian by the Zhonghua Book Company consist of over 5,600 pages.
