= Zhengdian (book) =

The Zhengdian (Chinese: 政典; Wade–Giles: Chengtien; lit. 'Political Institutions') was a 35-volume Chinese political treatise in historical form which was written approximately in 742 by Liu Zhi, son of esteemed historical critic Liu Zhiji. The book did not survive, but it was further expanded and borrowed by Du You in his Tongdian.
