= Liu Zhi (historian) =

Liu Zhi (simplified Chinese: 刘秩; traditional Chinese: 劉秩; pinyin: Liú Zhì; Wade–Giles: Liu Chih, fl. 8th century), courtesy name Zuoqing (柞卿), was a Chinese historian during the Tang dynasty and author of the Zhengdian. He was the fourth son of Liu Zhiji, little is known about his life, other than he was an official during the reign of Emperor Xuanzong of Tang and had been deposed on several occasions until the times of Emperor Suzong of Tang before his death.
