= Ōyumi =

Ancient Japanese artillery piece

Ōyumi were ancient Japanese artillery pieces that first appeared in the seventh century (during the Asuka Period). It is unknown exactly what kind of weapon the Oyumi was or how it looked, as there are no surviving examples or illustrations, but the Oyumi is thought to have been a type of siege crossbow.

== History and use ==
According to Japanese records, the Oyumi was different from the hand held crossbow also in use during the same time period. A quote from a seventh-century source seems to suggest that the Oyumi may have able to fire multiple arrows at once: "the Oyumi were lined up and fired at random, the arrows fell like rain". A ninth century Japanese artisan named Shimaki no Fubito claimed to have improved on a version of the weapon used by the Chinese; his version could rotate and fire projectiles in multiple directions. The last recorded use of the Oyumi was in 1189.
