= Crossbow =

Bow-like ranged weapon

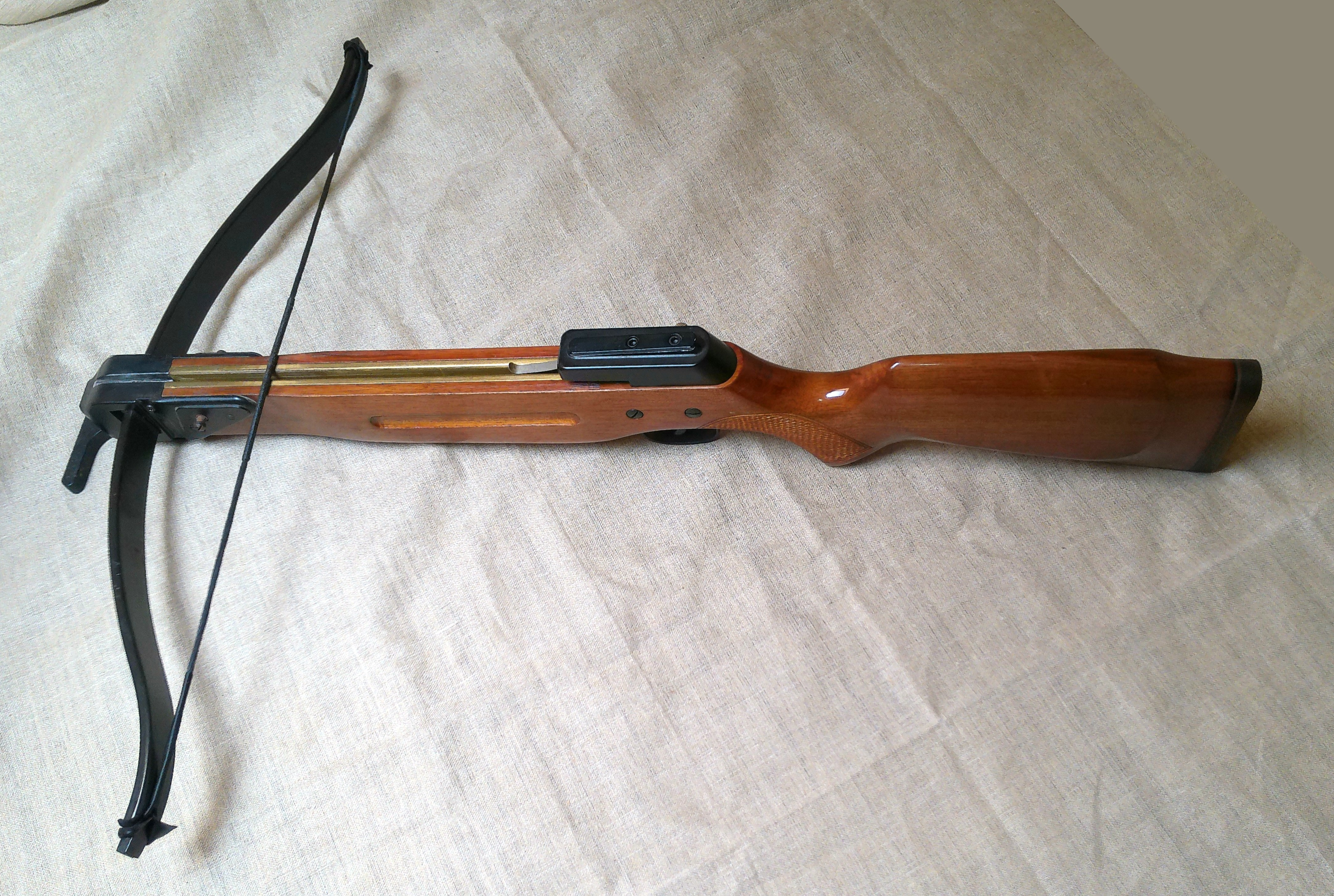
A typical crossbow

A crossbow is a ranged weapon using an elastic launching device consisting of a bow-like assembly called a prod, mounted horizontally on a main frame called a tiller, which is hand-held in a similar fashion to the stock of a long gun. Crossbows shoot arrow-like projectiles called bolts or quarrels. A person who uses a crossbow is called a crossbowman, an arbalister or an arbalist (after the arbalest, a European crossbow variant used during the 12th century).

Crossbows and bows use the same elastic launch principles, but differ in that an archer using a bow must draw-and-shoot in a quick and smooth motion with limited or no time for aiming, while a crossbow's design allows it to be spanned and cocked ready for use at a later time and thus affording the wielder unlimited time to aim. When shooting a bow, the archer must first fully perform the draw, holding the string and arrow while pulling them back with arm and back muscles, and then either immediately loose without a period of aiming, or hold that form while aiming. When using the heavy bows suitable for warfare, both actions demand some physical strength. As such, the accurate and sustained use of a bow in warfare takes much practice.

Crossbows avoid these potential problems by having trigger-released cocking mechanisms to maintain the tension on the string once it has been spanned – drawn – into its ready-to-shoot position, allowing a crossbow to be carried cocked and ready and affording its user time to aim it. This also allows for crossbows to be operated in succession by groups of people, with one person operating a cocked crossbow while others reload and ready them. Crossbows are spanned into their cocked positions using a number of techniques and devices, some of which are mechanical and employ gear and pulley arrangements – levers, belt hooks, pulleys, windlasses and cranequins – to overcome very high draw weight. These potentially achieve better precision and enable their effective use by less familiarised and trained personnel compared to the training and practice necessary to become proficient with the English longbow or the bows of steppe nomads.

These advantages for the crossbow are somewhat offset by the longer time needed to reload a crossbow for further shots. Crossbows with high draw weights require sophisticated systems of gears and pulleys to operate that are awkward and slow to employ on the battlefield. Medieval crossbows were also very inefficient, with short shot stroke lengths from the string lock to the release point of their bolts, along with the slower speeds of their steel prods and heavy strings, despite their massive draw weights compared to bows. Modern crossbow designs overcome these shortcomings.

The earliest known crossbows were invented in ancient China in the first millennium BCE and brought about a major shift in the role of projectile weaponry in wars, especially during Qin's unification wars and later the Han campaigns against northern nomads and western states. The medieval European crossbow was called by many names, including "crossbow" itself; most of these names derived from the word ballista, an ancient Greek torsion siege engine similar in appearance but different in design principle. The Greek crossbow was likely invented independently of the Chinese crossbow.

In modern times, firearms have largely supplanted bows and crossbows as weapons of war, but crossbows remain widely used for competitive shooting sports and hunting, and for relatively silent shooting.

== Terminology ==
A crossbowman is sometimes called an arbalist, also spelled arbelist, or historically an arbalister. An extensive list of archaic words for medieval crossbowmen is given by Payne-Gallwey. Richardson, in his 1839 dictionary, did not make specific reference to the crossbow in his definition of arbalist: "One who casts or shoots from a bow." Hansard (1841) used the word arbalister for a cross-bowman (sic), the same usage as Webster and Johnson who reserved the word arbalist for the crossbow itself. Smith uses arbalist to describe a maker of crossbows.

Arrow, bolt and quarrel are all suitable terms for crossbow projectiles, as was vire historically.

The lath, also called the prod, is the bow of the crossbow. According to W. F. Peterson, prod came into usage in the 19th century as a result of mistranslating rodd in a 16th-century list of crossbow effects.

The stock (a modern term derived from the equivalent concept in firearms) is the wooden body on which the bow is mounted, although the medieval tiller is also used.

The lock refers to the release mechanism, including the string, sears, trigger lever, and housing.

== Construction ==
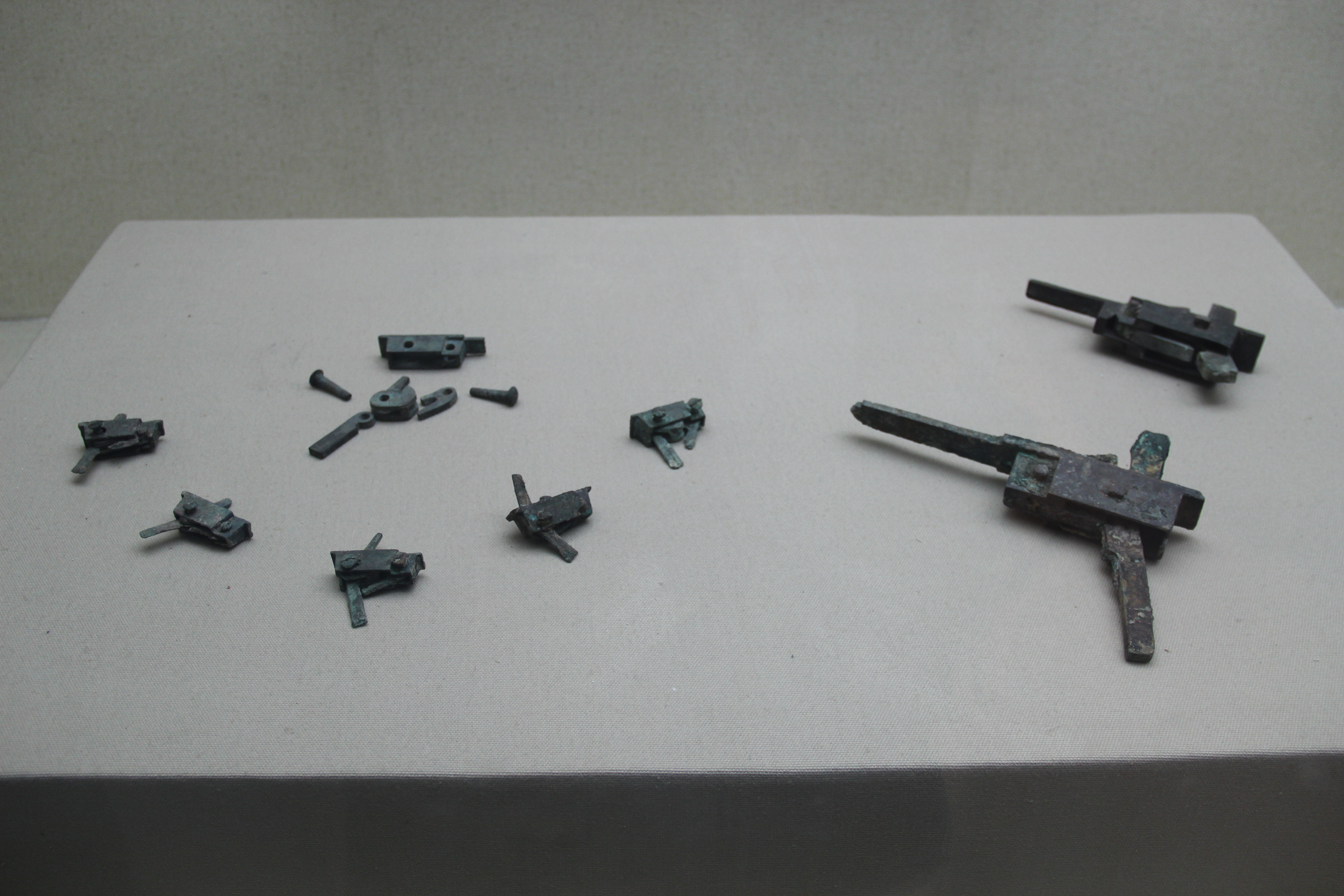
Qin and Western Han dynasty crossbow trigger pieces.

Medieval European crossbow nut mechanism: 1. Nut; 2. String; 3. Quarrel; 4. Trigger

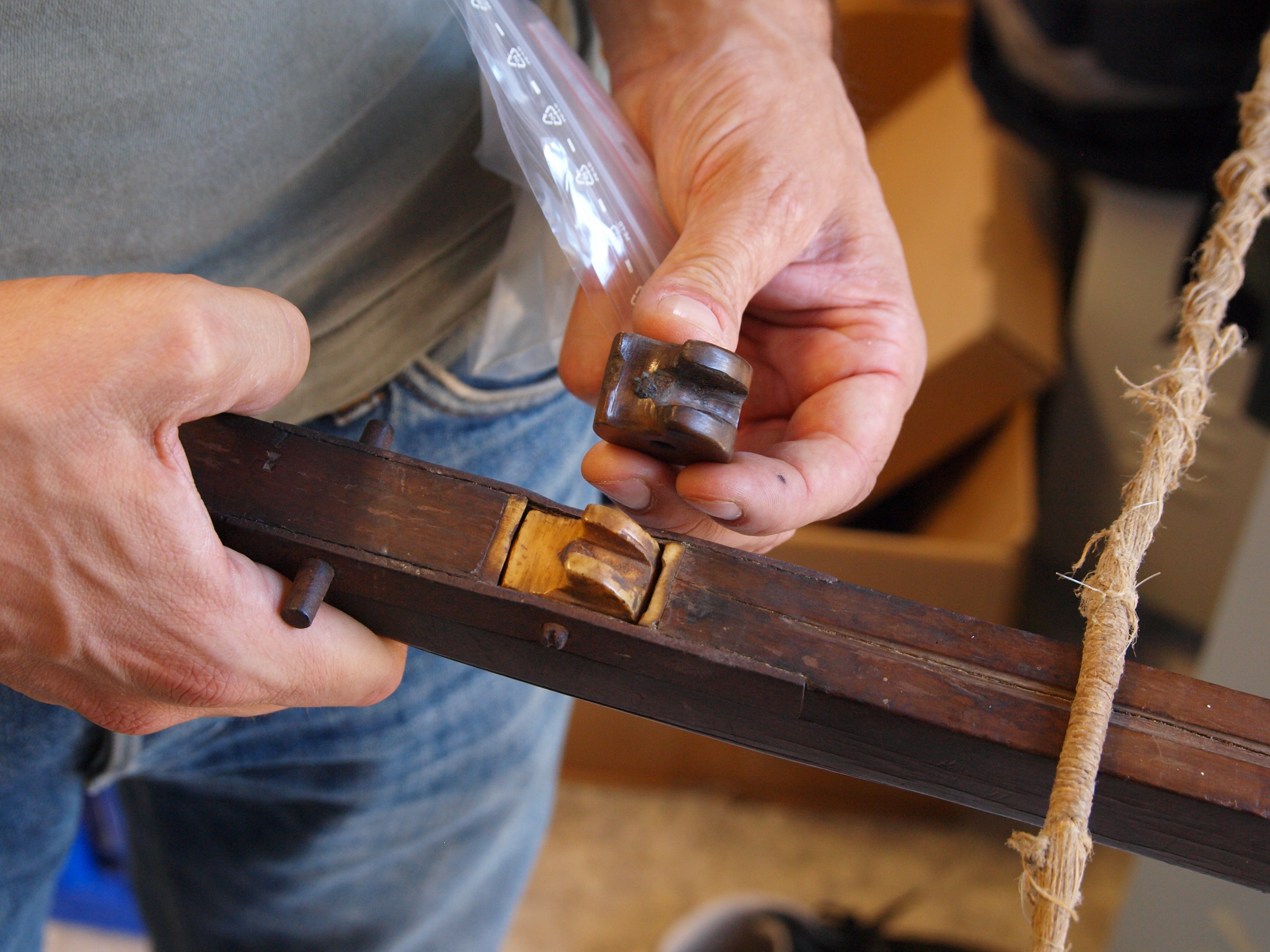
16th century crossbow nut excavated at Harburger Schloßstraße, Hamburg-Harburg, Germany

A crossbow is essentially a bow mounted on an elongated frame (called a tiller or stock) with a built-in mechanism that holds the drawn bow string, as well as a trigger mechanism, which is used to release the string.

=== Chinese vertical trigger lock ===
The Chinese trigger was a mechanism typically composed of three cast bronze pieces housed inside a hollow bronze enclosure. The entire mechanism is then dropped into a carved slot within the tiller and secured together by two bronze rods.

The string catch (nut) is shaped like a "J" because it usually has a tall erect rear spine that protrudes above the housing, which serves the function of both a cocking lever (by pushing the drawn string onto it) and a primitive rear sight.

It is held stationary against tension by the second piece, which is shaped like a flattened "C" and acts as the sear. The sear cannot move as it is trapped by the third piece, i.e. the actual trigger blade, which hangs vertically below the enclosure and catches the sear via a notch.

The two bearing surfaces between the three trigger pieces each offers a mechanical advantage, which allow for handling significant draw weights with a much smaller pull weight.

During shooting, the user will hold the crossbow at eye level by a vertical handle and aim along the arrow using the sighting spine for elevation, similar to how a modern rifleman shoots with iron sights.

When the trigger blade is pulled, its notch disengages from the sear and allows the latter to drop downwards, which in turn frees up the nuts to pivot forward and release the bowstring.

The nu (弩) [crossbow] is so called because it spreads abroad an aura of rage [nù] (怒). Its stock is like the arm of a man, therefore it is called bi (臂). That which hooks the bowstring is called ya (牙), for indeed it is like teeth. The part round about the teeth [i.e. the housing box] is called the guo (郭) ["city wall"], since it surrounds the gui (規) [lug] of the teeth [i.e. the locking nut]. Within [and below] there is the xuan dao (懸刀) ["hanging knife", i.e. the trigger blade] so called because it looks like one. The whole assembly is called ji (機)["machine" or "mechanism"], for it is just as ingenious as the loom.

— Shiming

=== European rolling nut lock ===
The earliest European designs featured a transverse slot in the top surface of the frame, down into which the string was placed. To shoot this design, a vertical rod is thrust up through a hole in the bottom of the notch, forcing the string out.

This rod is usually attached perpendicular to a rear-facing lever called a tickler. A later design implemented a rolling cylindrical pawl called a nut to retain the string. This nut has a perpendicular centre slot for the bolt, and an intersecting axial slot for the string, along with a lower face or slot against which the internal trigger sits.

They often also have some form of strengthening internal sear or trigger face, usually of metal. These roller nuts were either free-floating in their close-fitting hole across the stock, tied in with a binding of sinew or other strong cording; or mounted on a metal axle or pins.

Removable or integral plates of wood, ivory, or metal on the sides of the stock kept the nut in place laterally. Nuts were made of antler, bone, or metal. Bows could be kept taut and ready to shoot for some time with little physical straining, allowing crossbowmen to aim better without fatiguing.

=== Bow ===
Chinese crossbow prods were made of composite material from the start.

European crossbows from the 10th to 12th centuries used wood for the bow, also called the prod or lath, which tended to be ash or yew.

Composite bows started appearing in Europe during the 13th century and could be made from layers of different material, often wood, horn, and sinew glued together and bound with animal tendon. These composite bows made of several layers are much stronger and more efficient in releasing energy than simple wooden bows.

As steel became more widely available in Europe around the 14th century, steel prods came into use.

Traditionally, the prod was often lashed to the stock with rope, whipcord, or other strong cording. This is called the bridle.

=== Spanning mechanism ===
The Chinese used winches for large crossbows mounted on fortifications or wagons, known as "bedded crossbows" (床弩). Winches may have been used for handheld crossbows during the Han dynasty (202 BC – 9 AD, 25–220 AD), but there is only one known depiction of it.

The 11th century Chinese military text Wujing Zongyao mentions types of crossbows using winch mechanisms, but it is not known if these were actually handheld crossbows or mounted crossbows.

Another drawing method involved the shooters sitting on the ground, and using the combined strength of leg, waist, back and arm muscles to help span much heavier crossbows, which were aptly called "waist-spun crossbows" (腰張弩).

During the medieval era, both Chinese and European crossbows used stirrups as well as belt hooks.

In the 13th century, European crossbows started using winches, and from the 14th century an assortment of spanning mechanisms such as winch pulleys, cord pulleys, gaffles (such as gaffe levers, goat's foot levers, and rarer internal lever-action mechanisms), cranequins, and even screws.

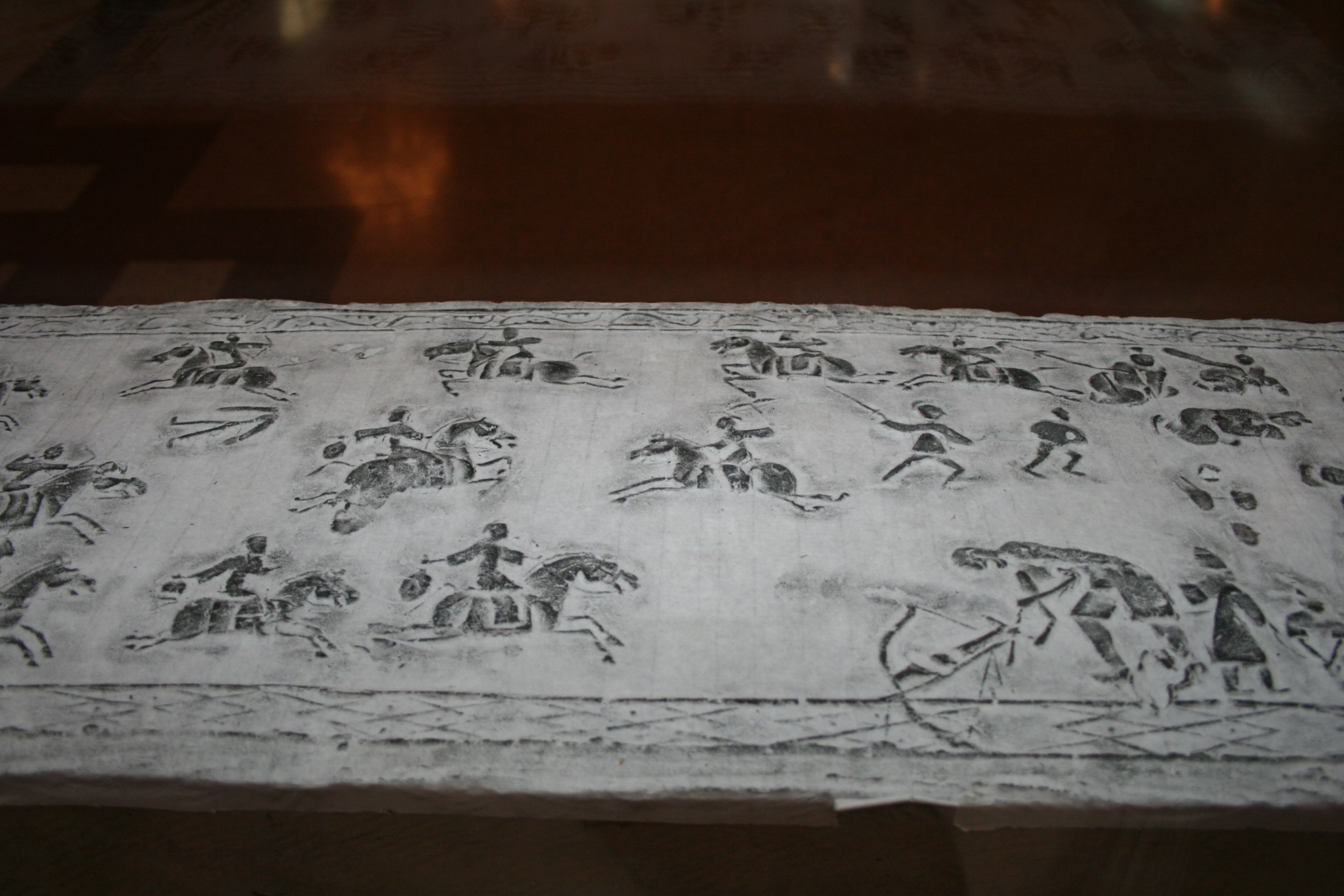
Battle scene depicting a man spanning a crossbow using a winch mechanism, possibly mounted on a frame, Han dynasty

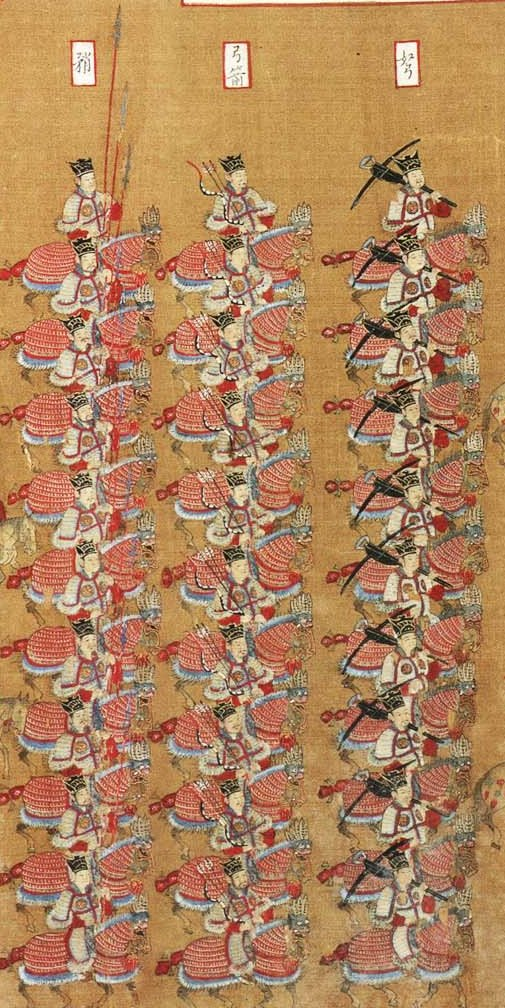
Song dynasty cavalry wielding crossbows with stirrups

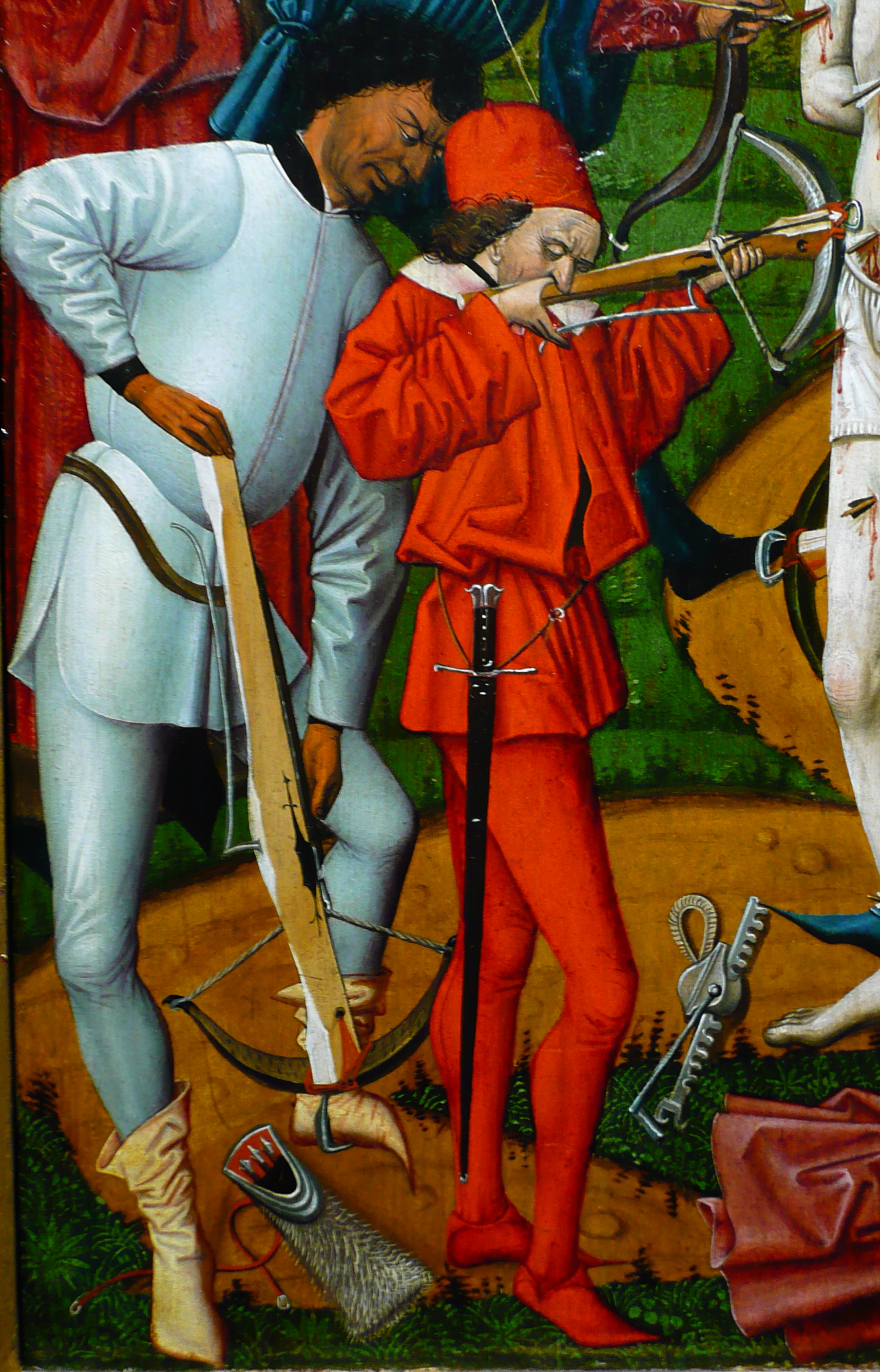
Fifteenth century crossbowman using a stirrup along with a belt hook and pulley

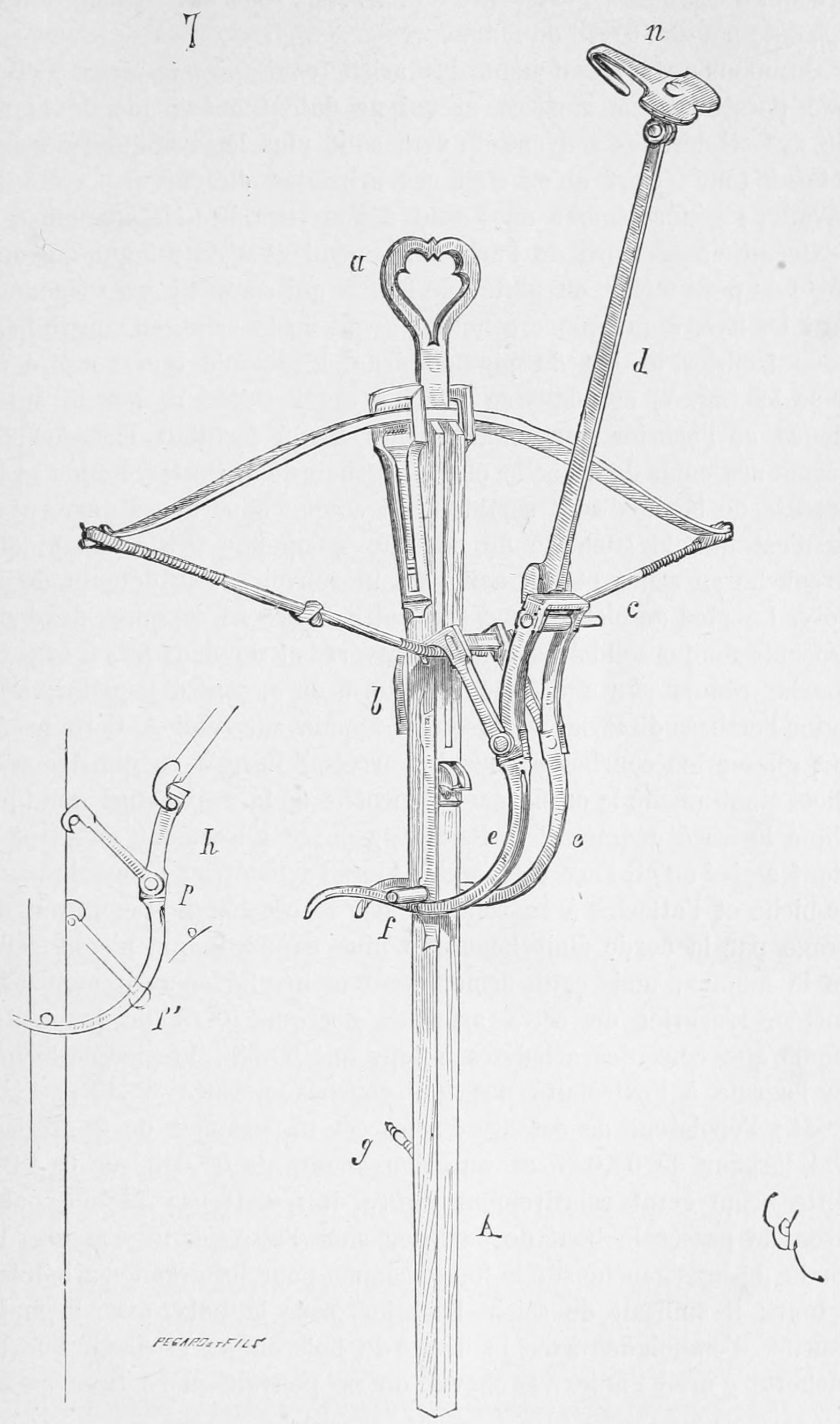
Detailed illustration of a goat's foot lever mounted on a crossbow that is half-spanned

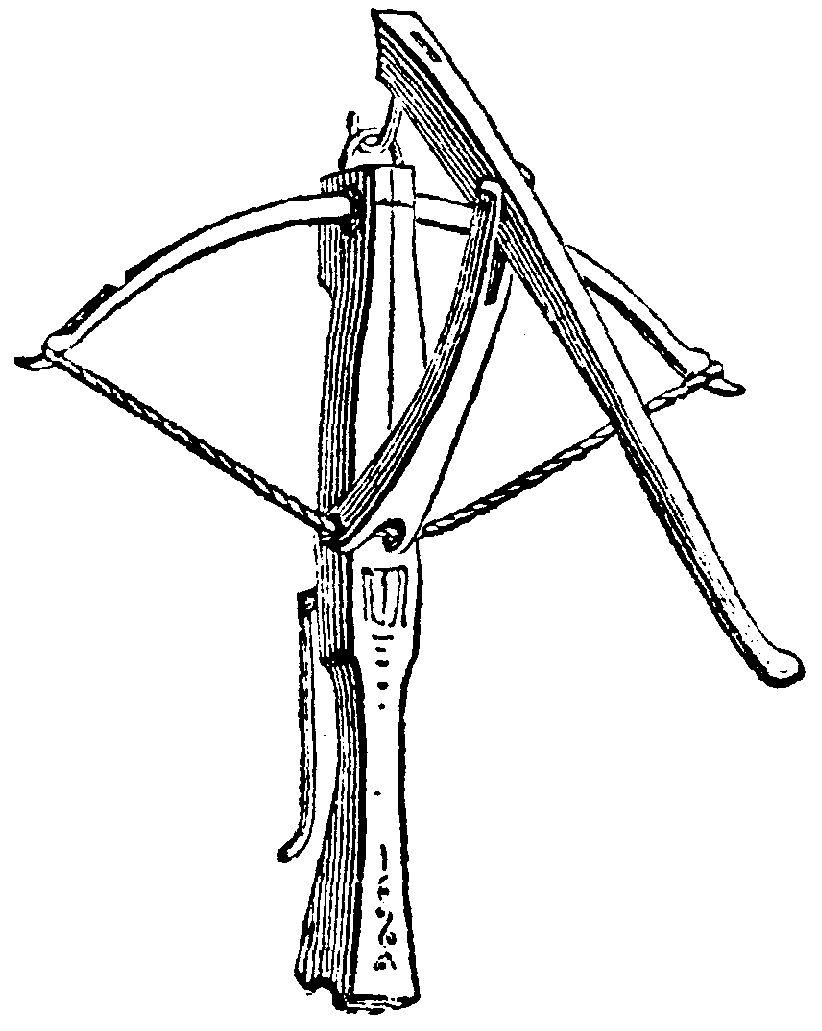
Illustration of a gaffe lever mounted on a crossbow that is nearly at full-span.

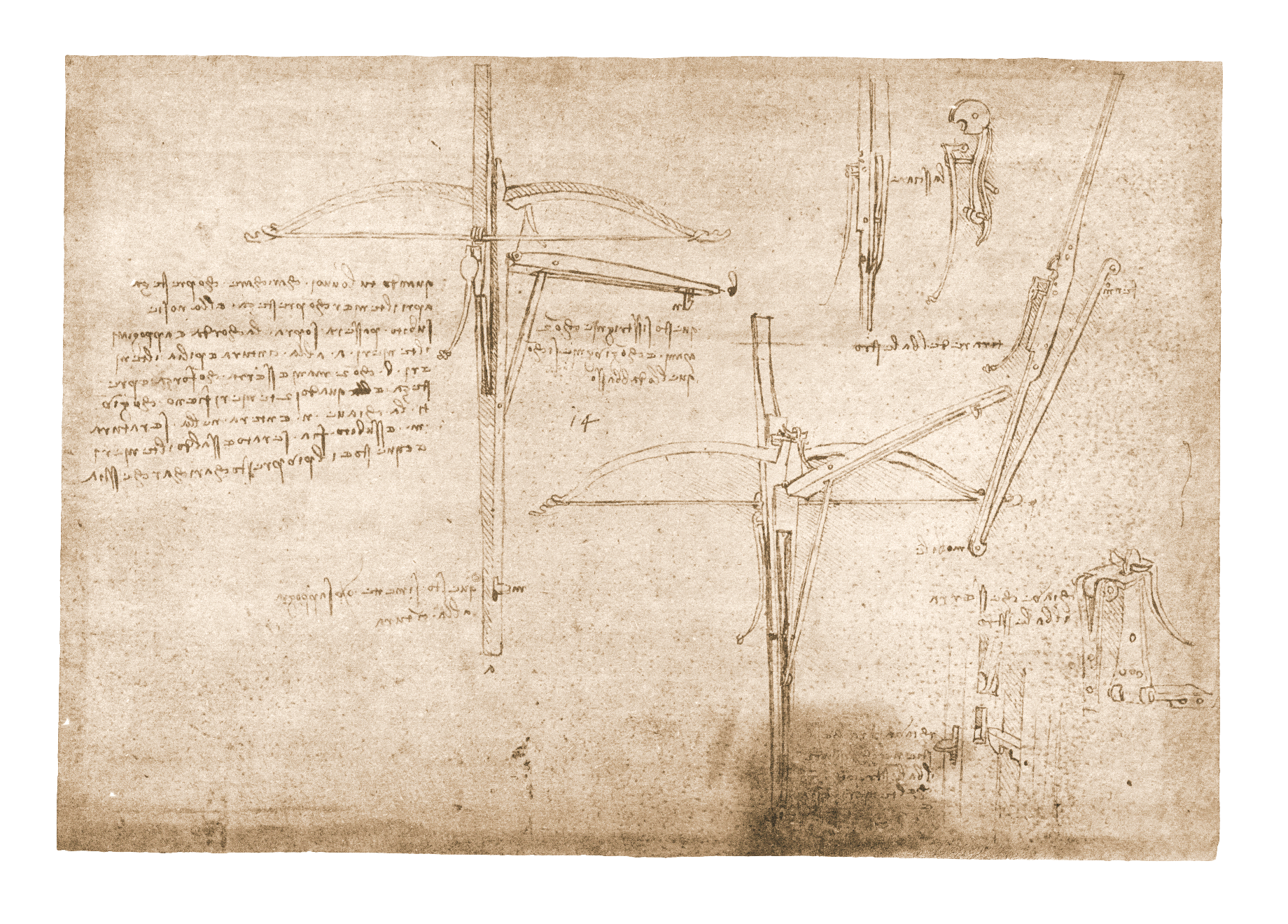
Illustrations of Leonardo da Vinci's rapid fire crossbow in the 15th-century Codex Atlanticus. Note the internal lever mechanism is fully extended to catch the draw string.

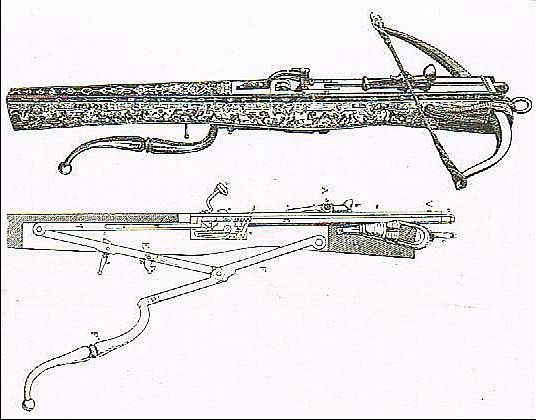
Internal mechanical illustration of a German bullet-shooting crossbow's self-spanning mechanism

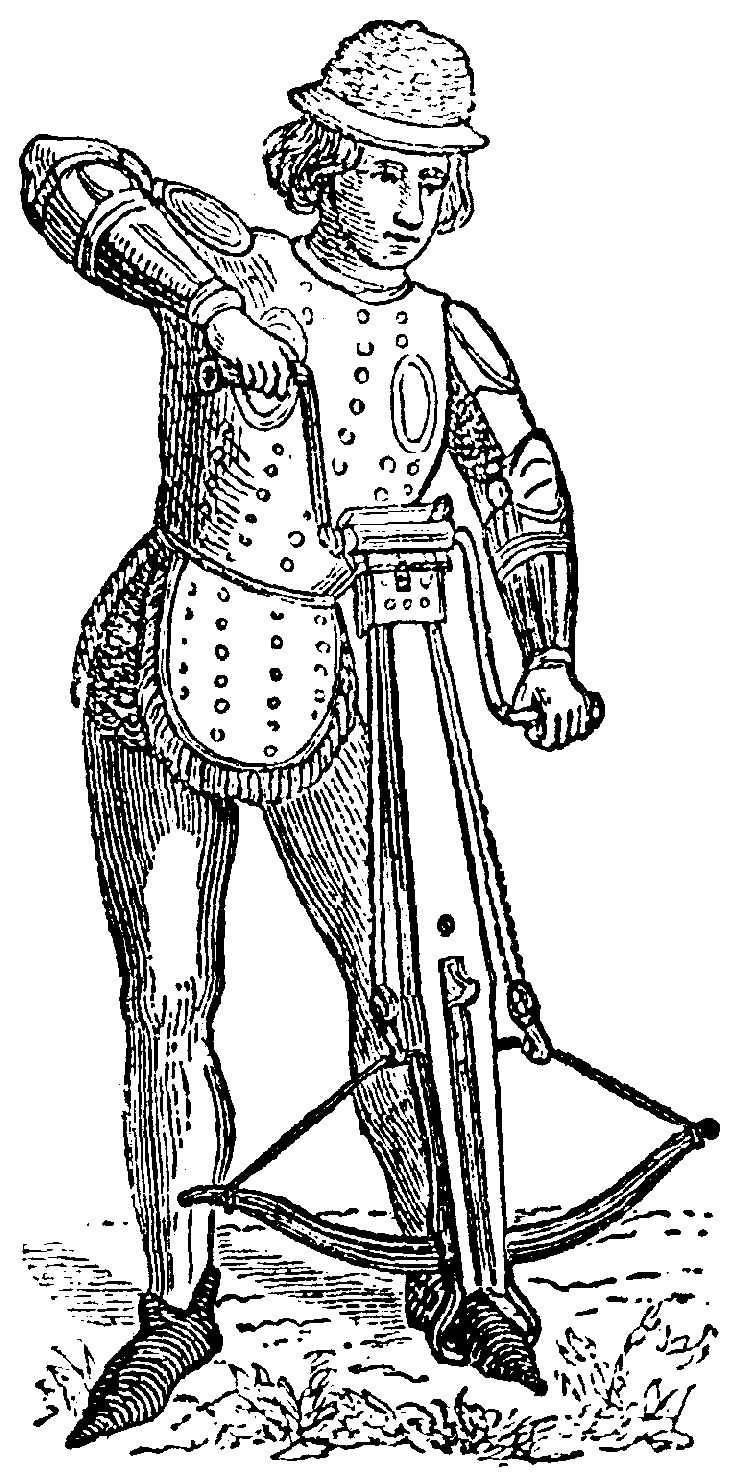
Twentieth century depiction of a windlass pulley

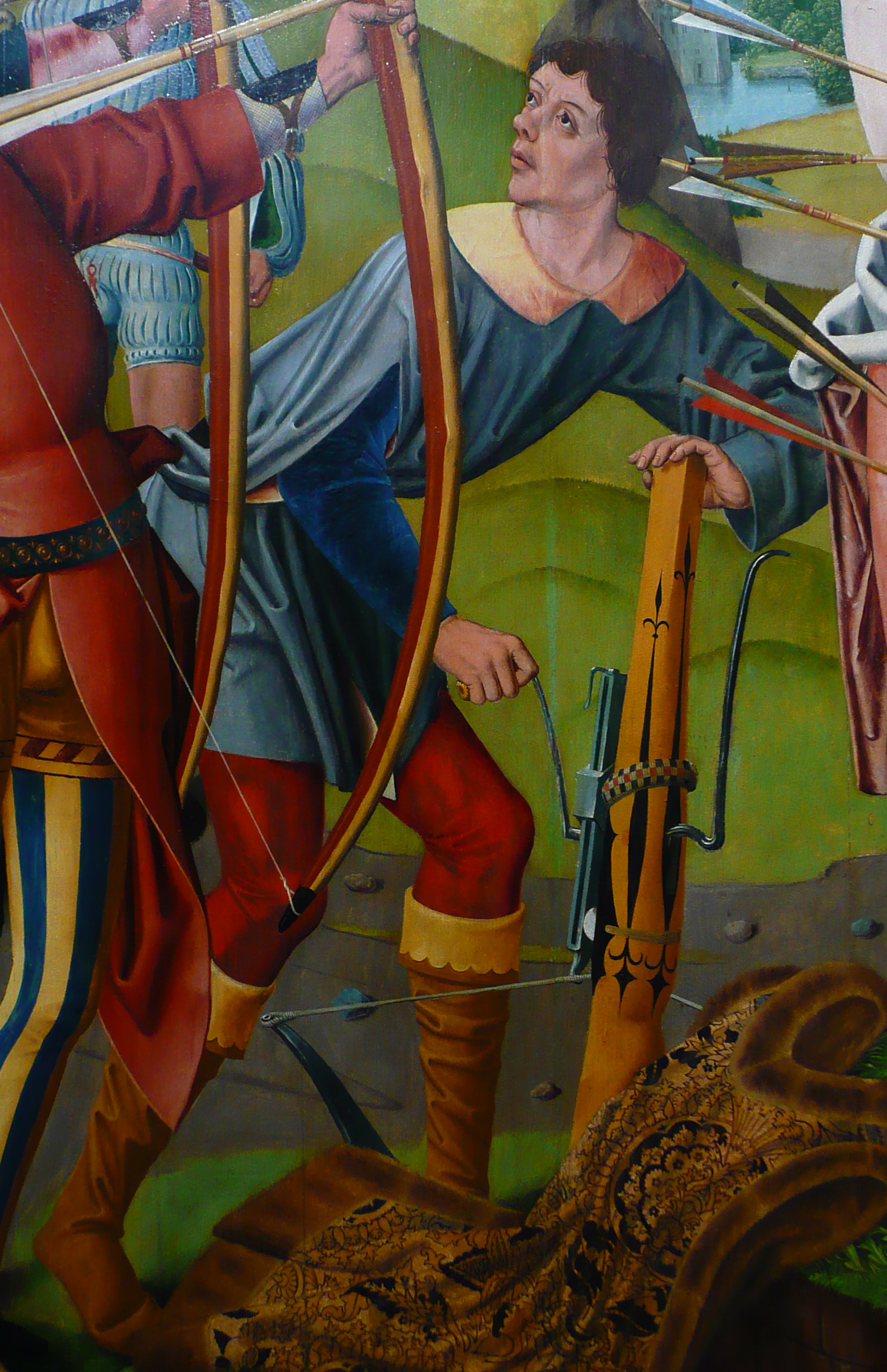
Fifteenth century crossbowman using a cranequin (rack and pinion)

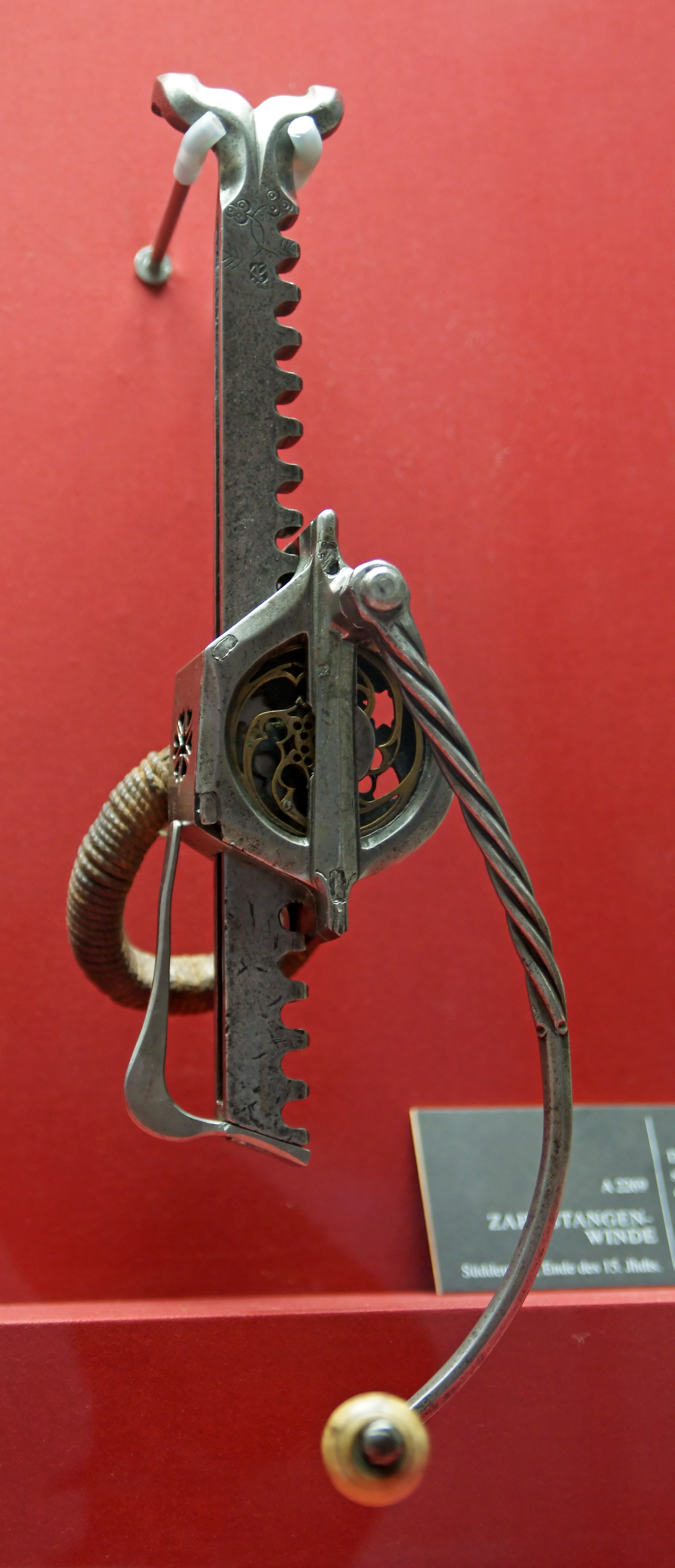
Iron cranequin, South German, late 15th century

=== Variants ===
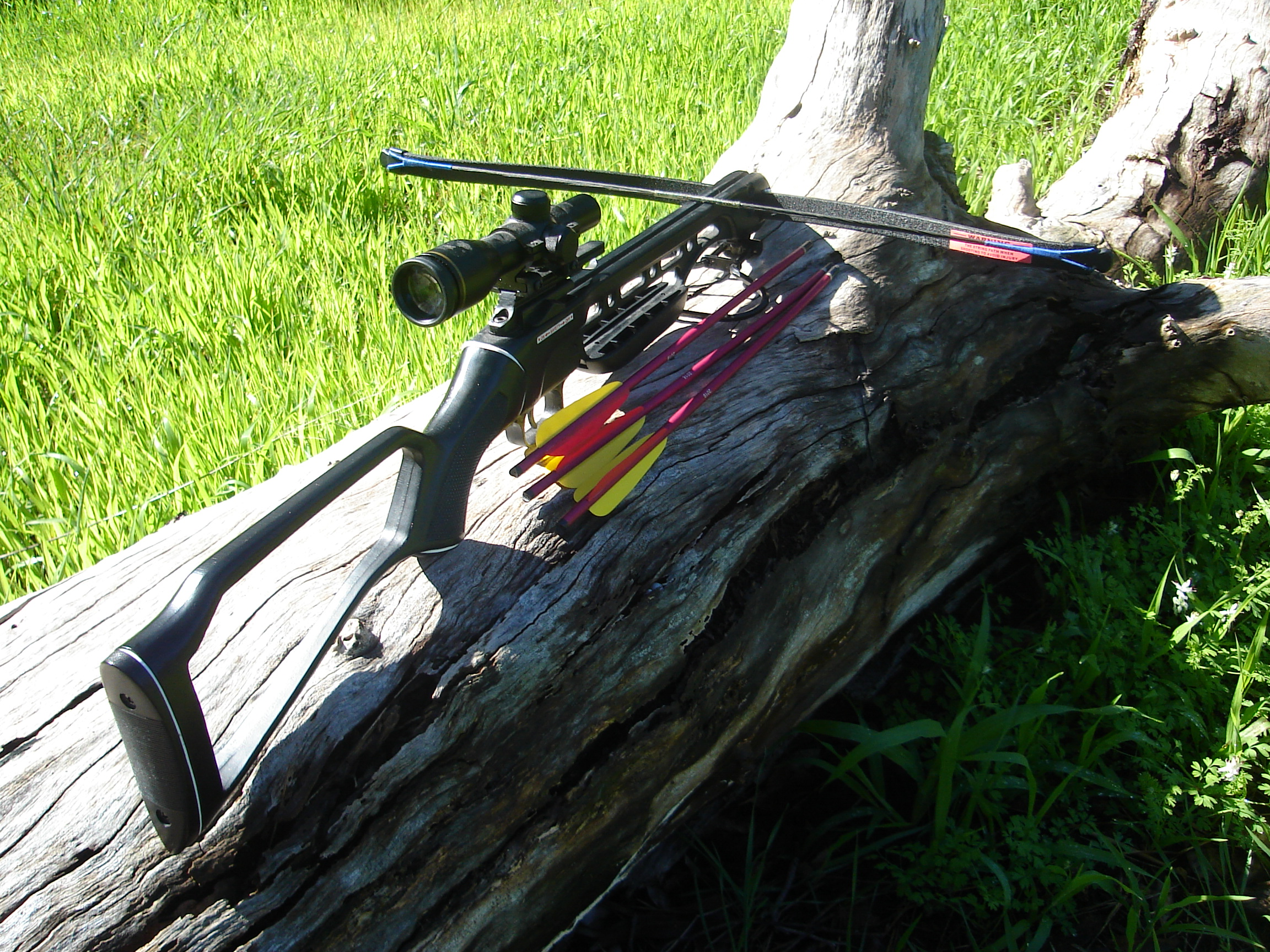
Modern recurve crossbow

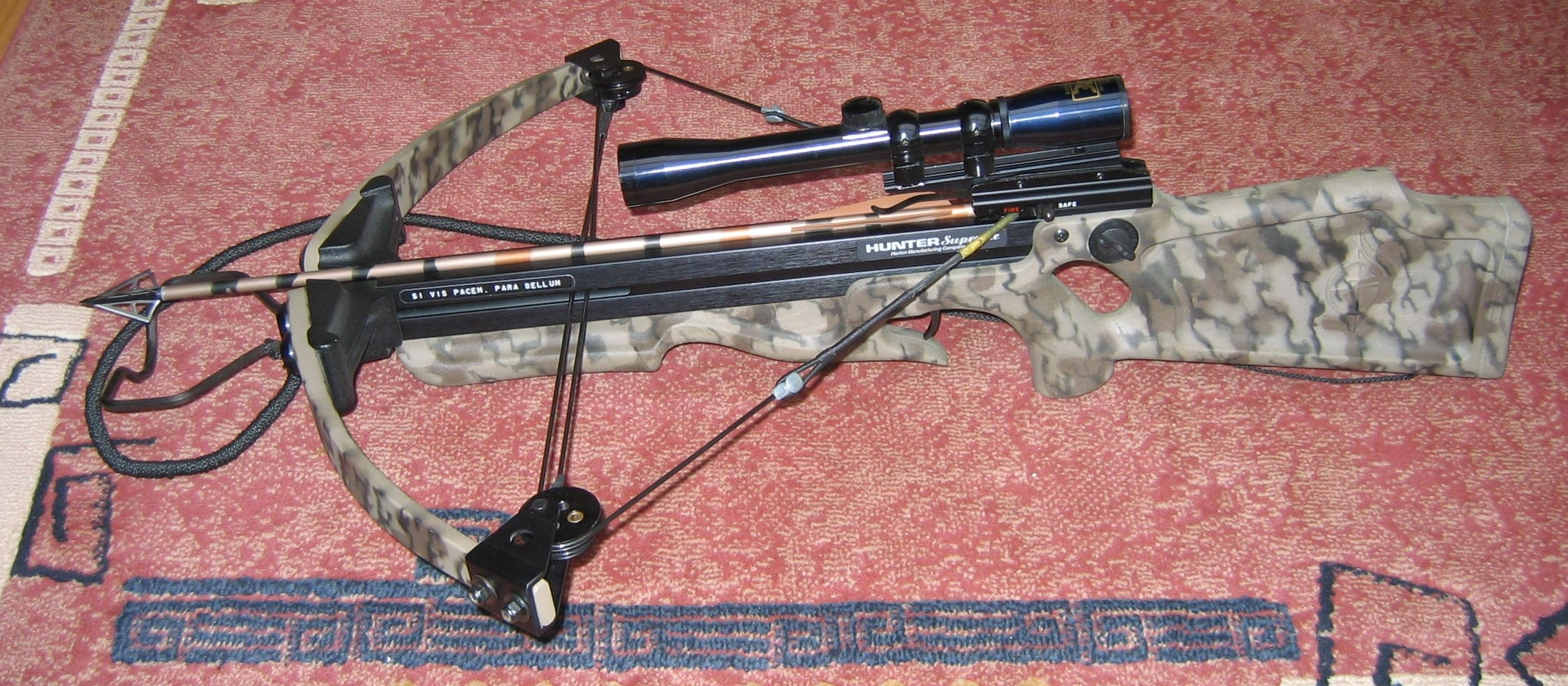
Modern compound crossbow

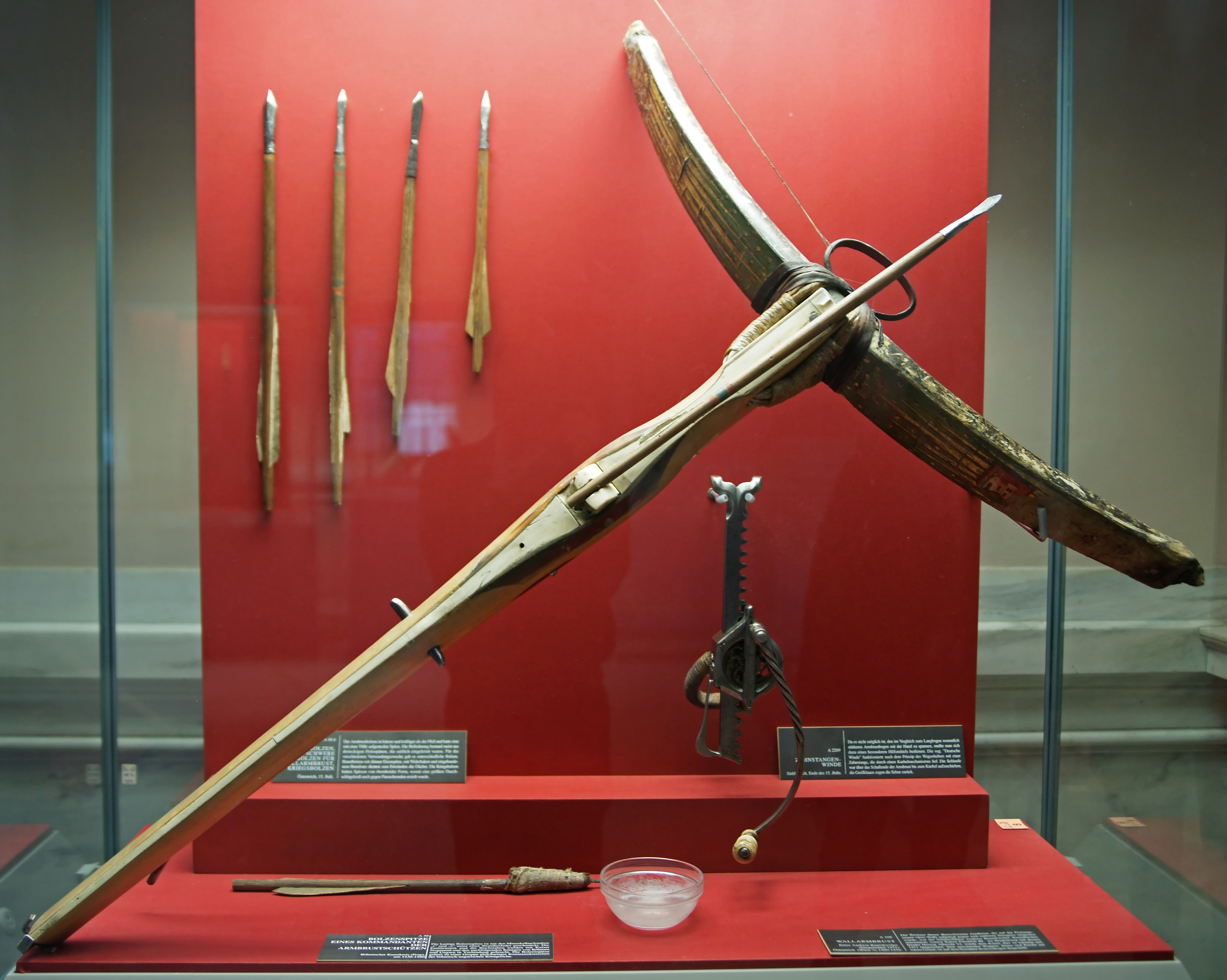
15th-century Wallarmbrust, a heavy crossbow used for siege defense

The smallest crossbows are pistol crossbows. Others are simple long stocks with the crossbow mounted on them. These could be shot from under the arm.

The next step in development was stocks of the shape that would later be used for firearms, which allowed better aiming. The arbalest was a heavy crossbow that required special systems for pulling the sinew via windlasses.

For siege warfare, the size of crossbows was further increased to hurl large projectiles, such as rocks, at fortifications. The required crossbows needed a massive base frame and powerful windlass devices.

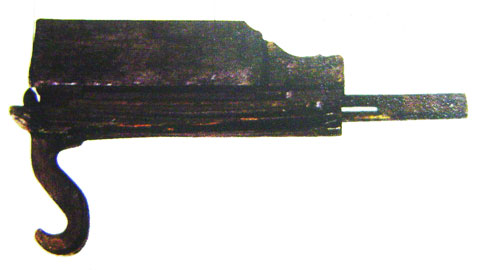
Double shot repeating crossbow, also known as the Chu state repeating crossbow (chuguo nu)

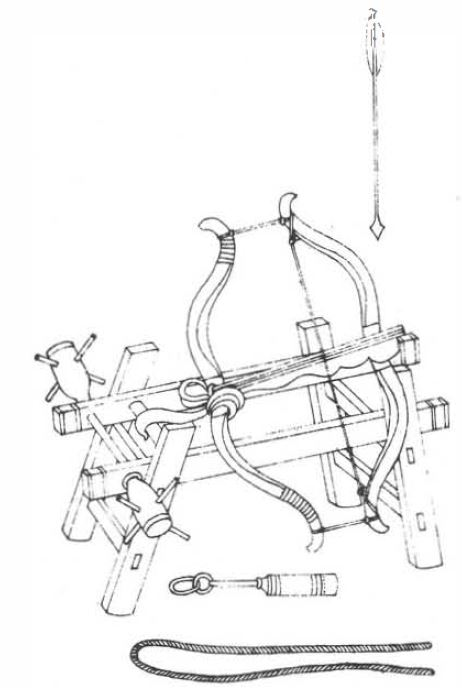
Mounted double bow crossbow

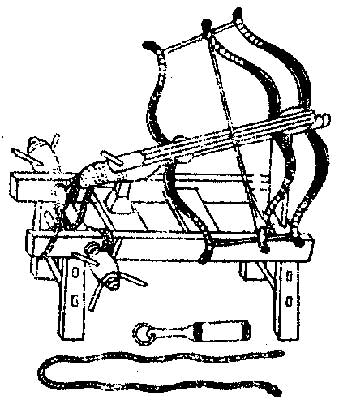
Mounted triple bow crossbow

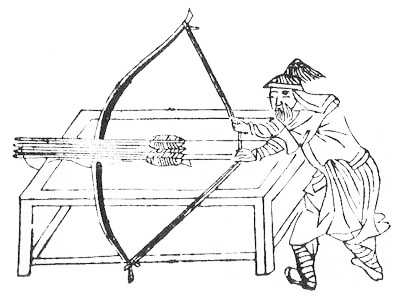
Multi-bolt crossbow without a visible nut or cocking aid

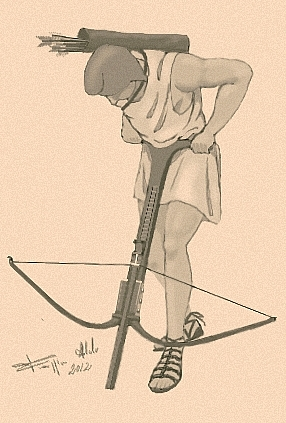
Cocking of a Greek gastraphetes

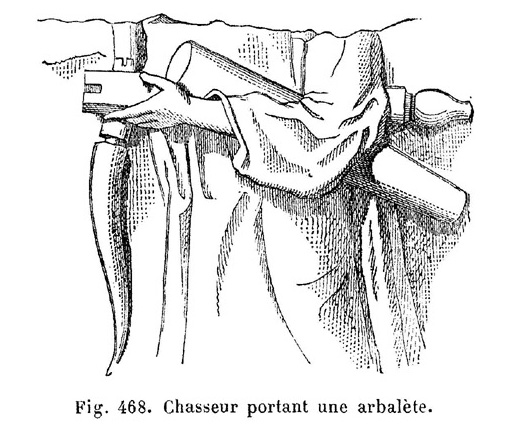
Gallo-Roman crossbow

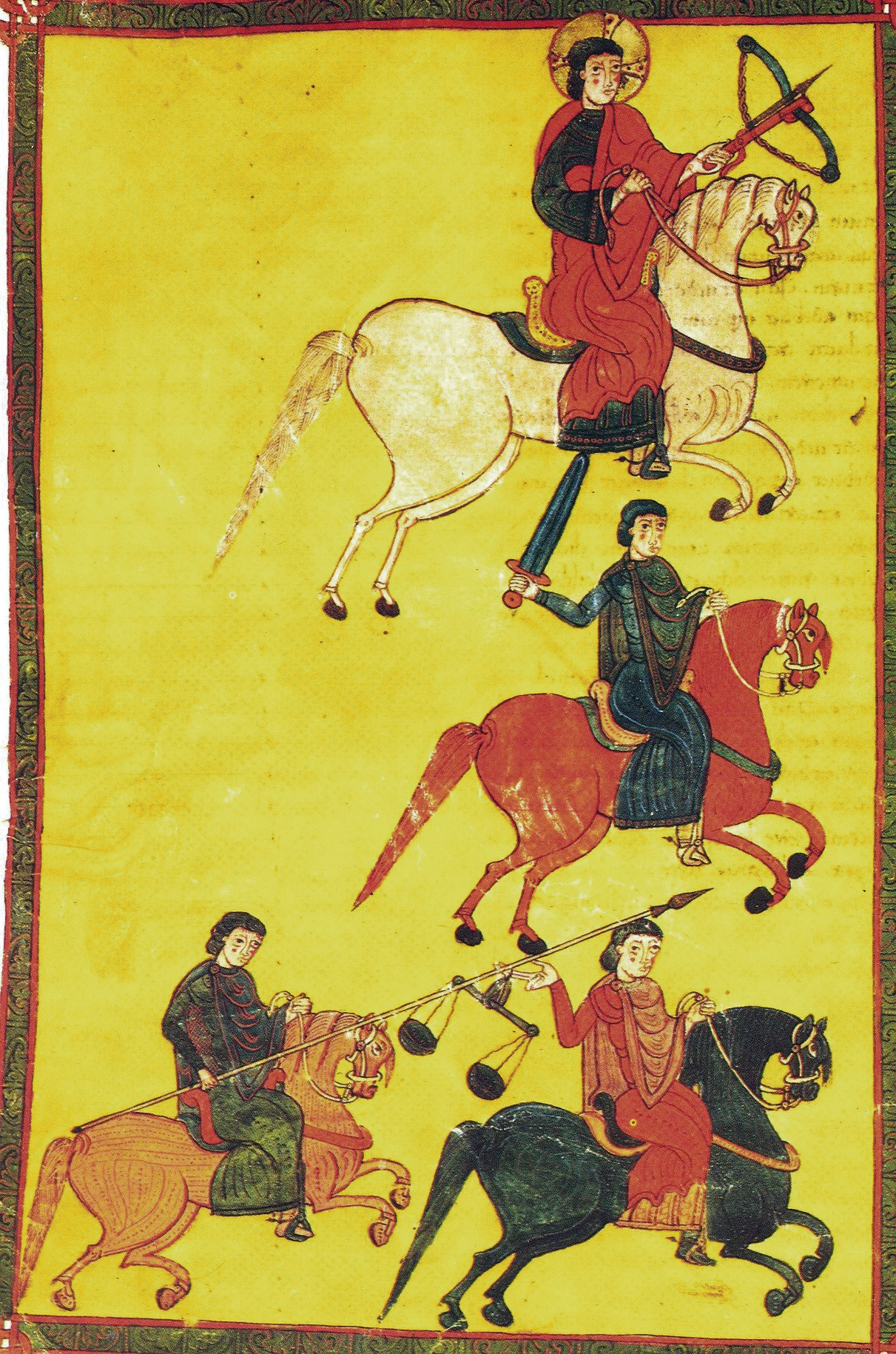
Earliest European depiction of cavalry using crossbows, from the Catalan manuscript Four Horsemen of the Apocalypse, 1086

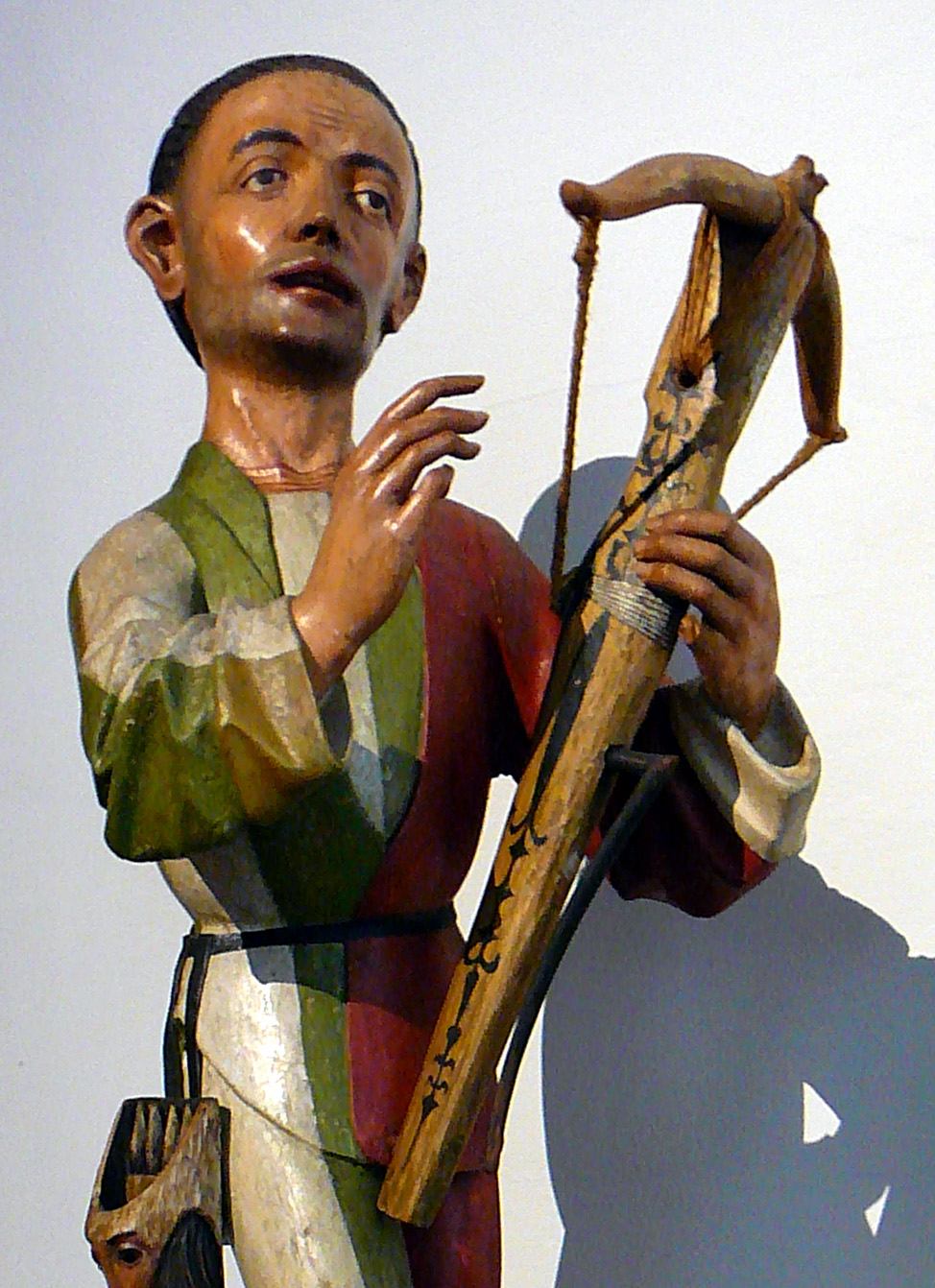
Late medieval crossbowman from c. 1480

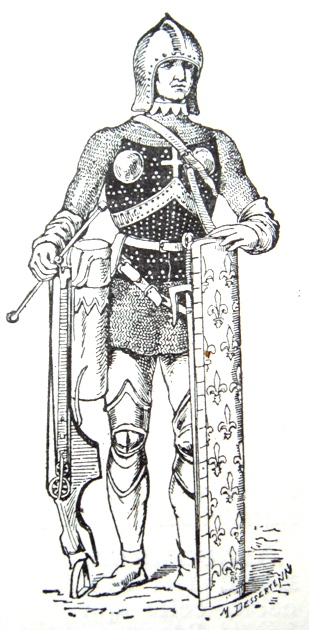
15th-century French soldier carrying an arbalest and a pavise

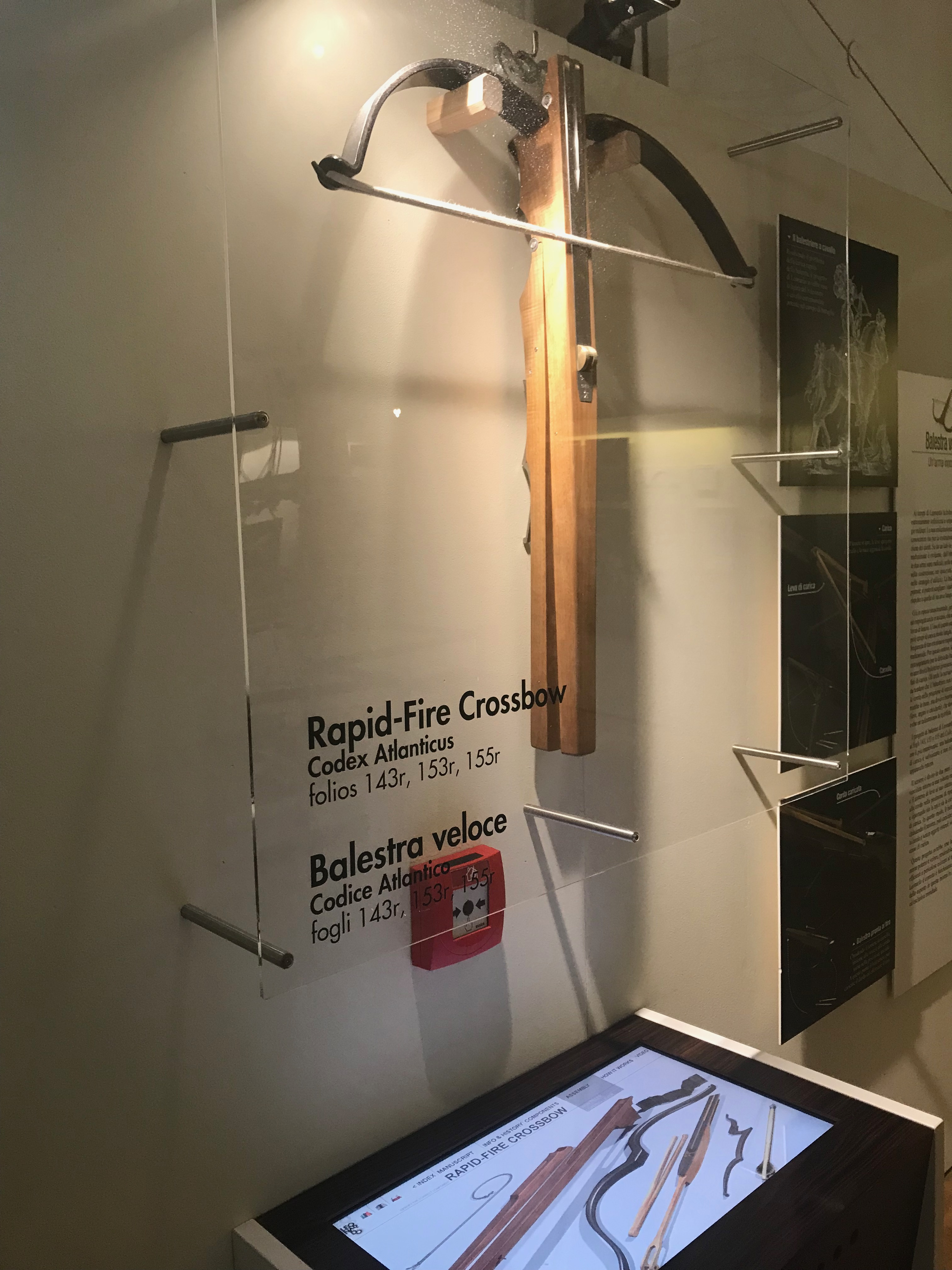
A reconstruction of Leonardo da Vinci's rapid fire crossbow as shown at the World of Leonardo Exhibition in Milan

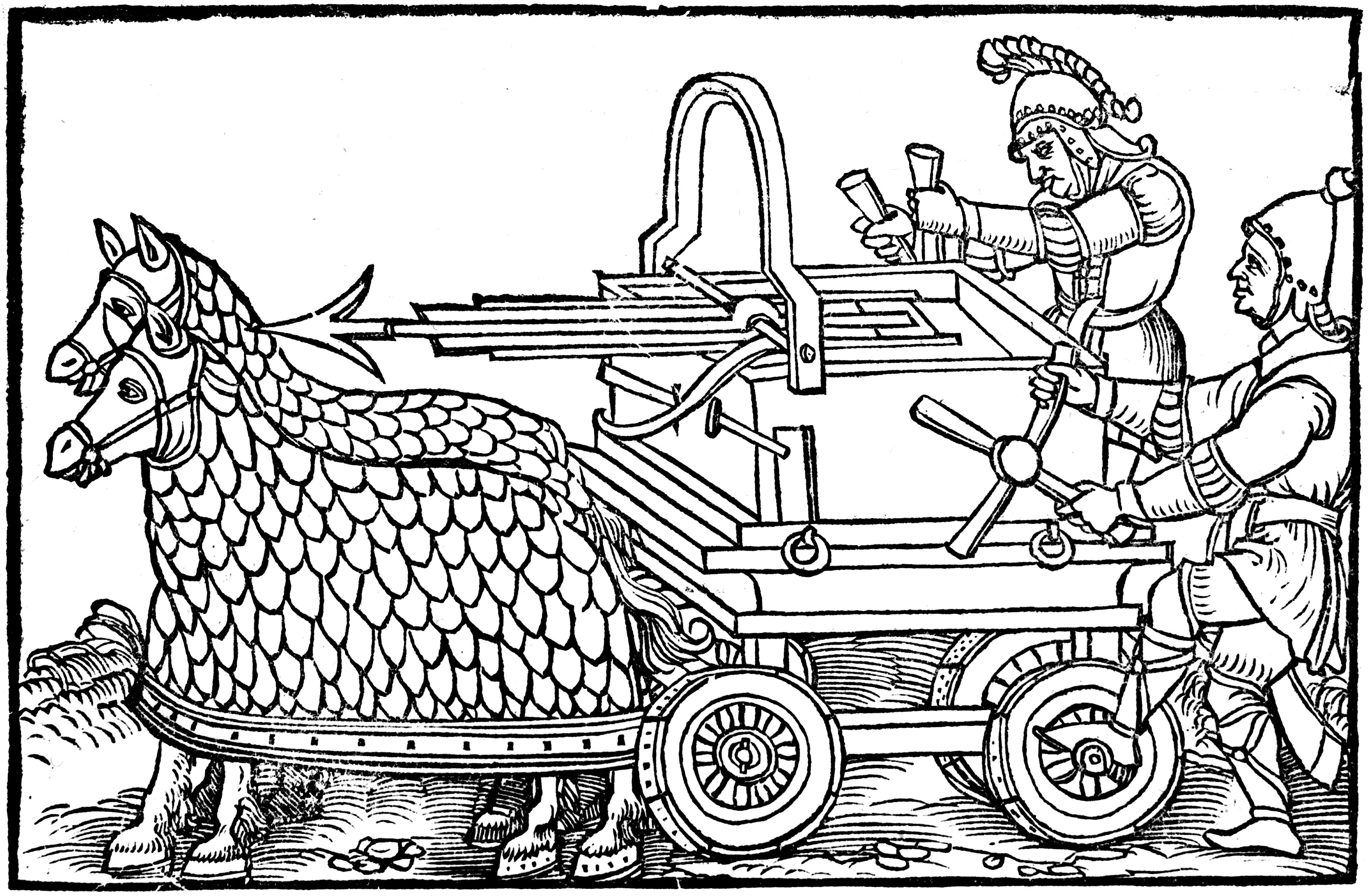
Early modern four-wheeled ballista drawn by armored horses (1552)

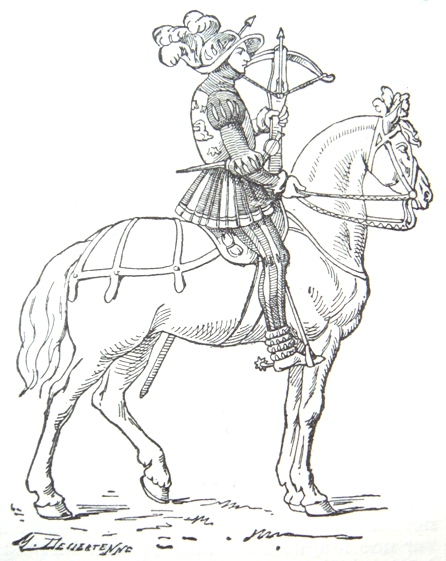
16th-century French mounted crossbowman (cranequinier). His crossbow is drawn with a rack-and-pinion cranequin, so it can be used while riding.

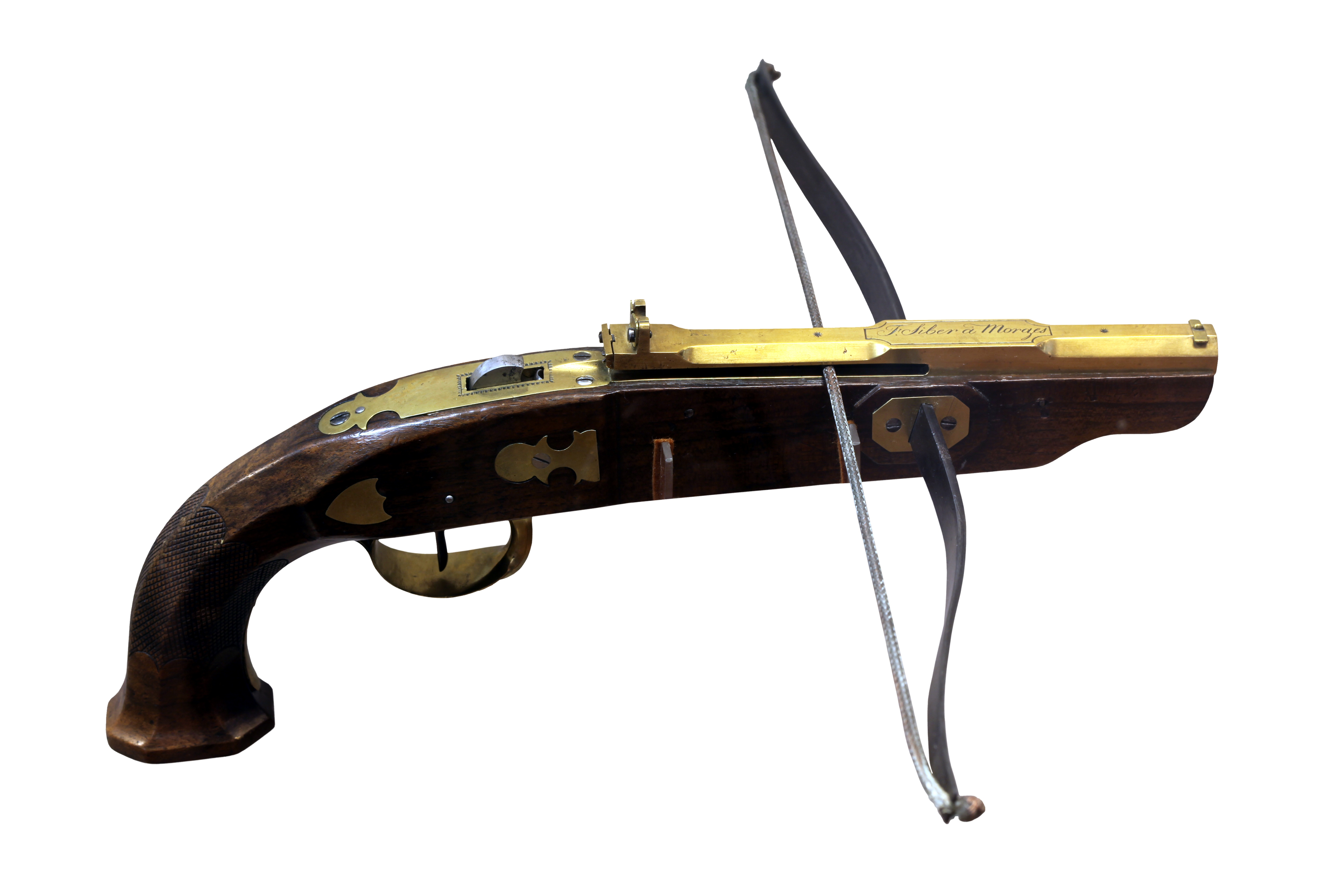
Pistol crossbow for home recreational shooting. Made by Frédéric Siber in Morges, early 19th century, on display at Morges military museum.

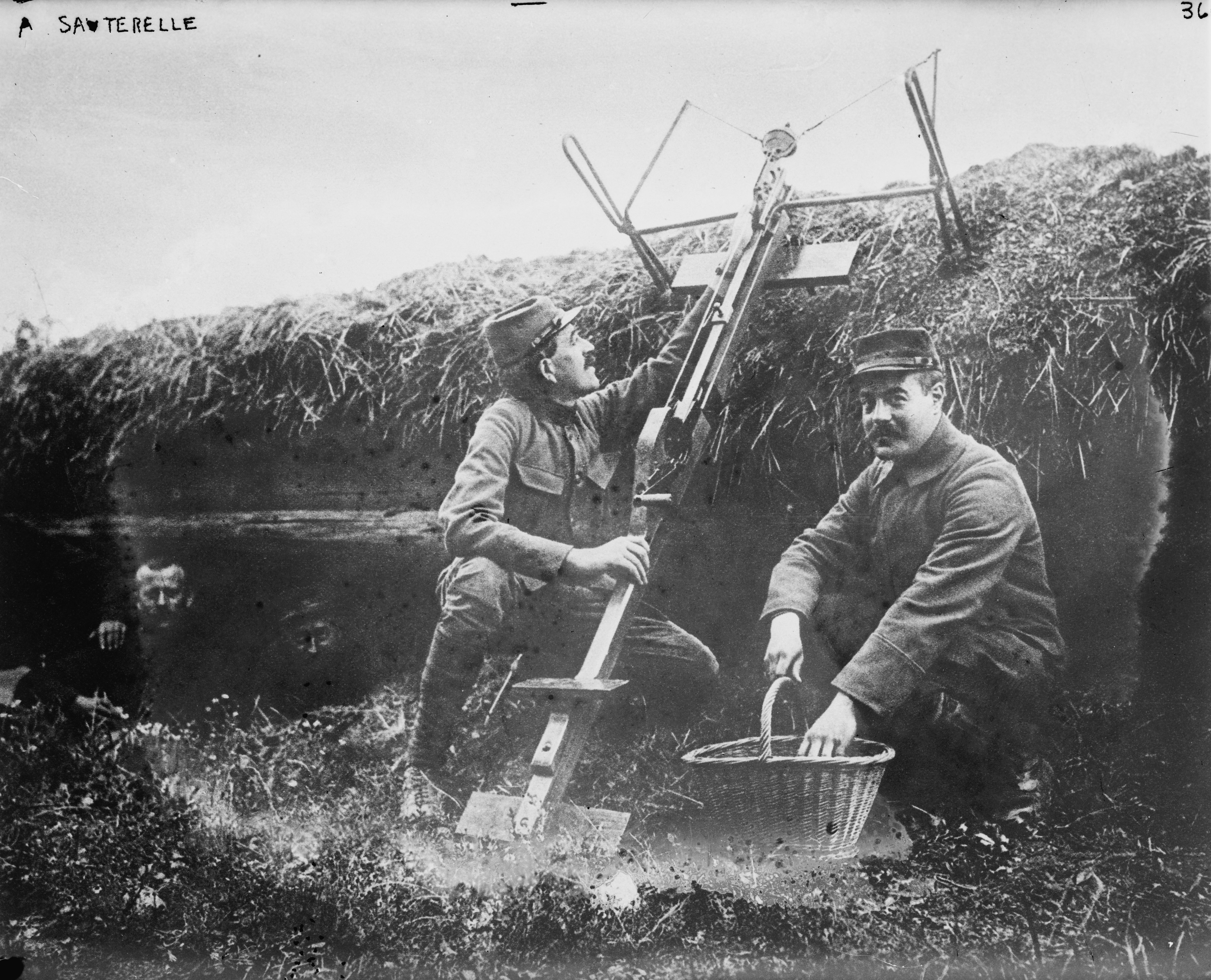
French cross-bow grenade thrower Arbalète sauterelle (lit. 'grasshopper crossbow') type A d'Imphy, circa 1915

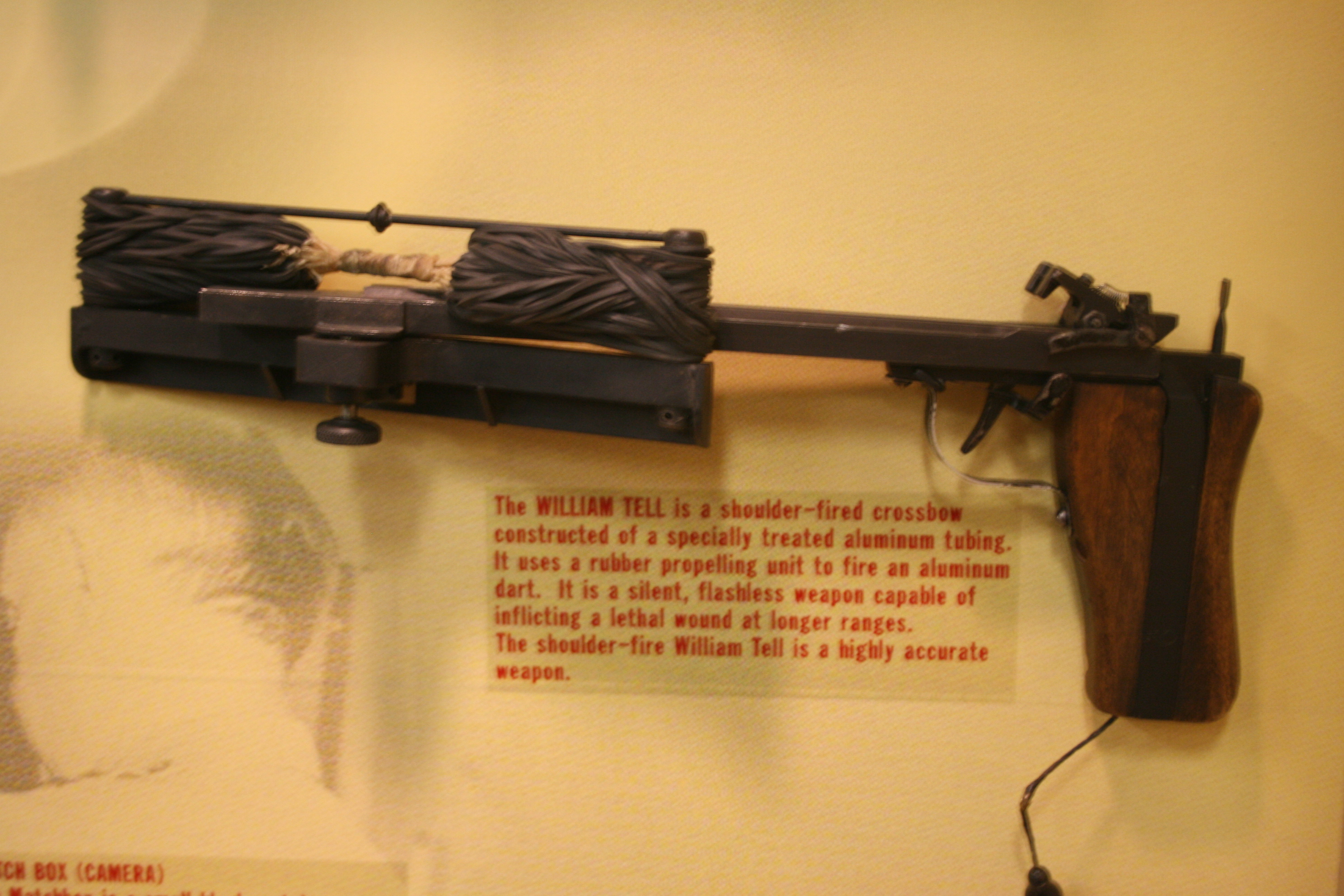
OSS "William Tell" crossbow

=== Projectiles ===
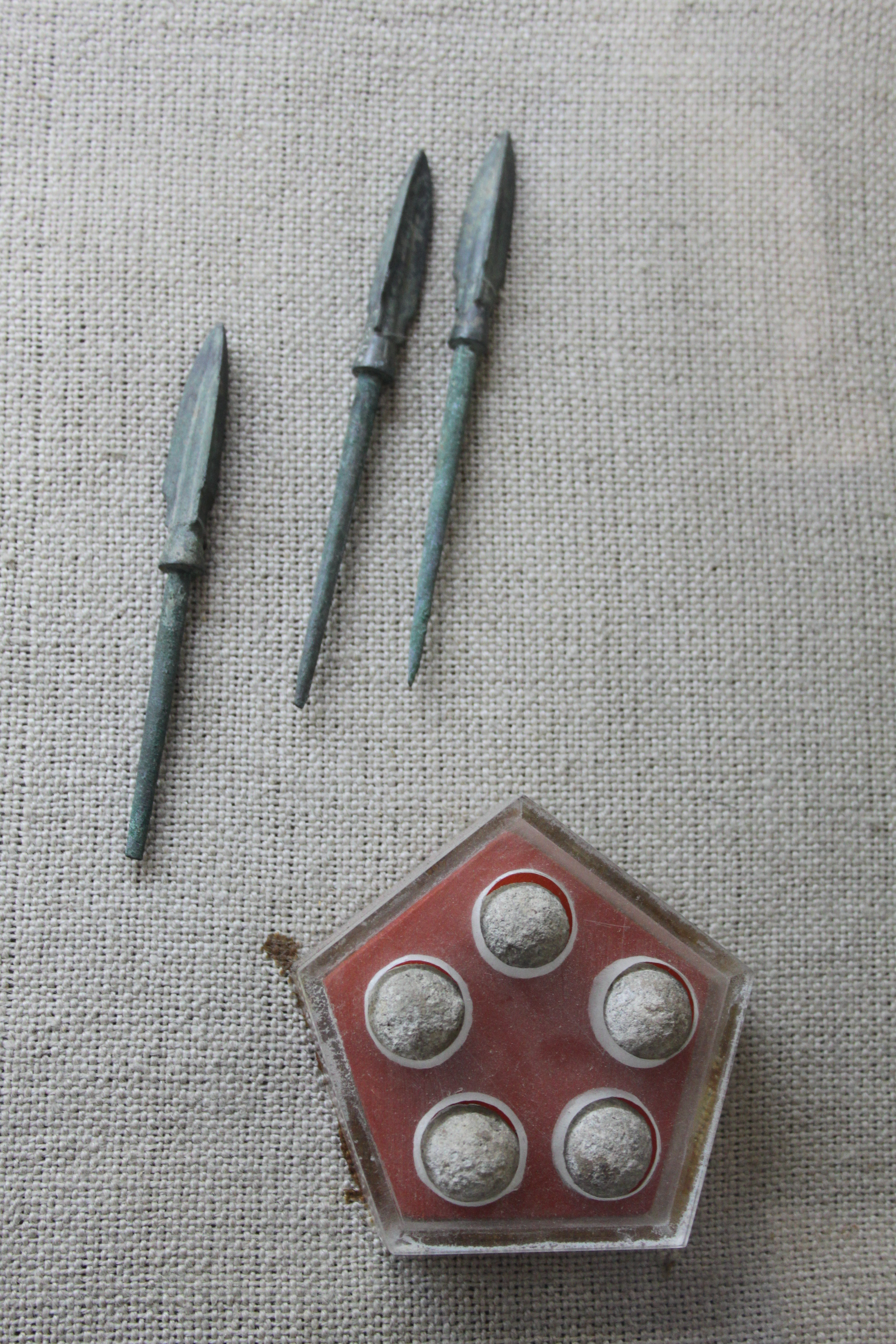
Arrowheads and lead balls, Han dynasty

The arrow-like projectiles of a crossbow are called bolts or quarrels. These are usually much shorter than arrows but can be several times heavier.

There is an optimum weight for bolts to achieve maximum kinetic energy, which varies depending on the strength and characteristics of the crossbow, but most could pass through common mail.

Crossbow bolts can be fitted with a variety of heads, some with sickle-shaped heads to cut rope or rigging; but the most common today is a four-sided point called a quarrel. A highly specialized type of bolt is employed to collect blubber biopsy samples used in biology research.

Even relatively small differences in arrow weight can have a considerable impact on its flight trajectory and drop.

Bullet-shooting crossbows are modified crossbows that use bullets or stones as projectiles.

=== Accessories ===
The reticle of a modern crossbow telescopic sight allows the shooter to adjust for different ranges.

The ancient Chinese crossbow often included a metal (i.e. bronze or steel) grid serving as iron sights. Modern crossbow sights often use similar technology to modern firearm sights, such as red dot sights and telescopic sights. Many crossbow scopes feature multiple crosshairs to compensate for the significant effects of gravity over different ranges. In most cases, a newly bought crossbow will need to be sighted for accurate shooting.

A major cause of the sound of shooting a crossbow is vibration of various components. Crossbow silencers are multiple components placed on high vibration parts, such as the string and limbs, to dampen vibration and suppress the sound of loosing the bolt.

== History ==
=== China ===
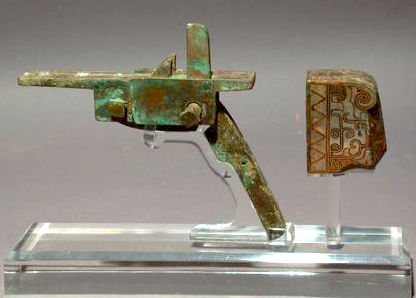
A bronze crossbow trigger mechanism and butt plate that were mass-produced in the Warring States period (475–221 BC)

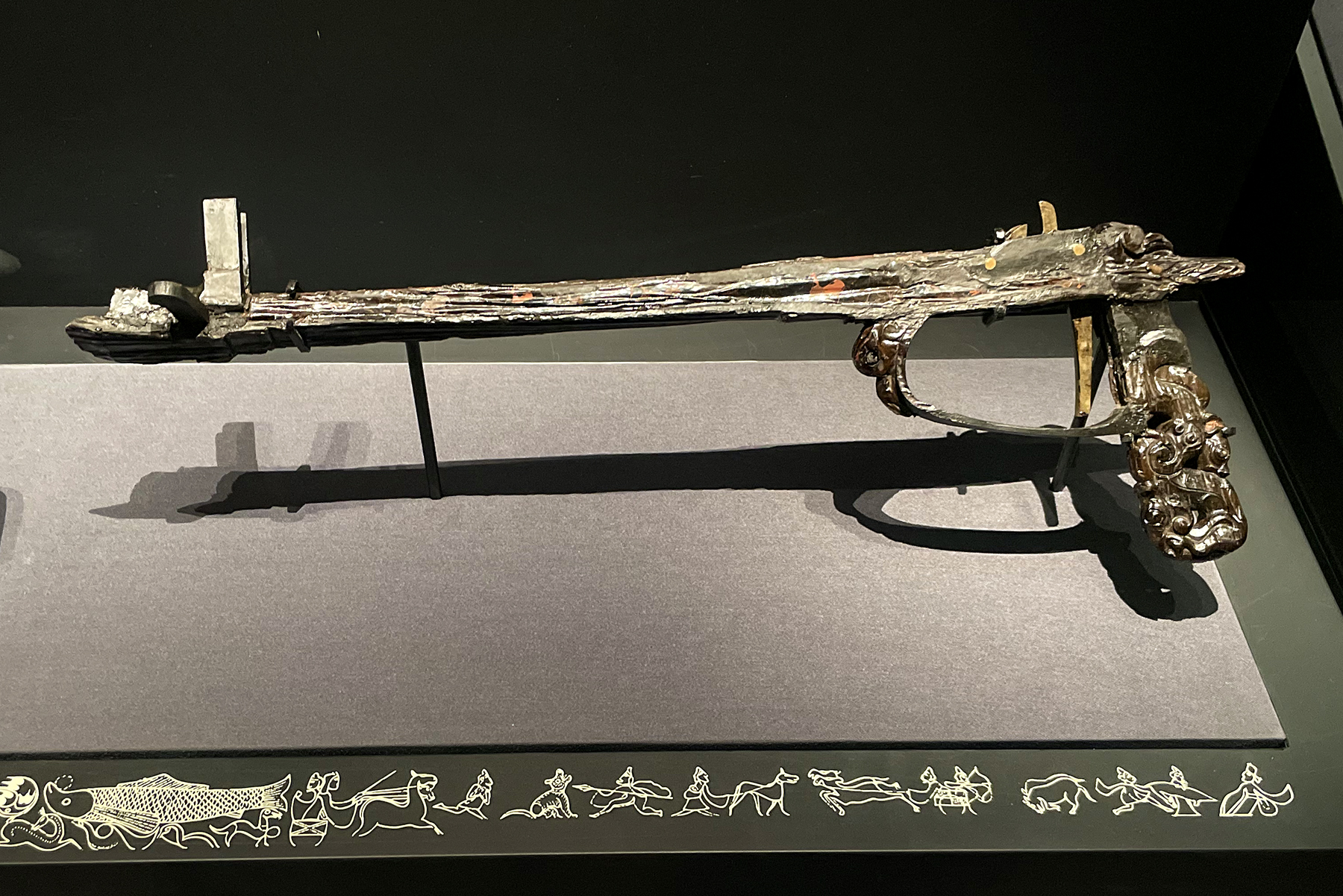
Remains of a lacquered pistol crossbow. China, Warring States period (475–221 BC)

In terms of archaeological evidence, crossbow locks dated c. 650 BC made of cast bronze have been found in China . They have also been found in Tombs 3 and 12 at Qufu, Shandong, previously the capital of Lu, and date to the 6th century BC. Bronze crossbow bolts dating from the mid-5th century BC have been found at a Chu burial site in Yutaishan, Jiangling County, Hubei Province. Other early finds of crossbows were discovered in Tomb 138 at Saobatang, Hunan Province, and date to the mid-4th century BC. It is possible that these early crossbows used spherical pellets for ammunition. A Western Han mathematician and music theorist, Jing Fang (78–37 BC), compared the moon to the shape of a round crossbow bullet. The Zhuangzi also mentions crossbow bullets.

The earliest Chinese documents mentioning a crossbow were texts from the 4th to 3rd centuries BC attributed to the followers of Mozi. This source refers to the use of a giant crossbow between the 6th and 5th centuries BC, corresponding to the late Spring and Autumn period. Sun Tzu's The Art of War (first appearance dated between 500 BC to 300 BC) refers to the characteristics and use of crossbows in chapters 5 and 12 respectively, and compares a drawn crossbow to "might". The Huainanzi advises its readers not to use crossbows in marshland where the surface is soft and it is hard to arm the crossbow with the foot. The Records of the Grand Historian, completed in 94 BC, mentions that Sun Bin defeated Pang Juan by ambushing him with a battalion of crossbowmen at the Battle of Maling in 342 BC. The Book of Han, finished 111 AD, lists two military treatises on crossbows.

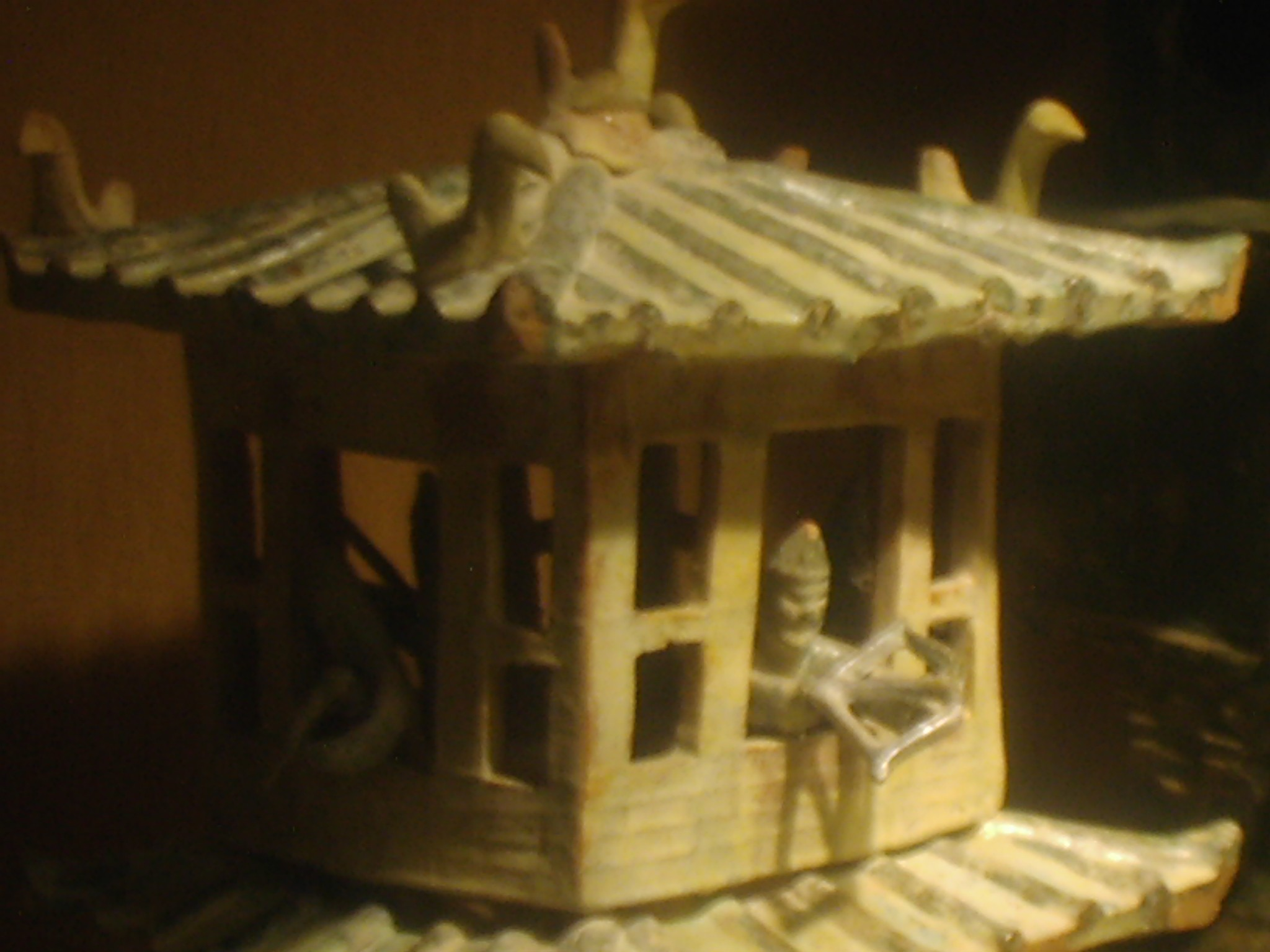
A miniature guard wielding a handheld crossbow from the top balcony of a model watchtower, made of glazed earthenware during the Eastern Han (25–220 AD), from the Metropolitan Museum of Art.

Handheld crossbows with complex bronze trigger mechanisms have also been found with the Terracotta Army in the tomb of Qin Shi Huang (r. 221–210 BC) that are similar to specimens from the subsequent Han dynasty (202 BC–220 AD), while crossbowmen described in the Qin and Han dynasty learned drill formations, some were even mounted as charioteers and cavalry units, and Han dynasty writers attributed the success of numerous battles against the Xiongnu and Western Regions city-states to massed crossbow volleys. The bronze triggers were designed in such a way that they were able to store a large amount of energy within the bow when drawn but was easily shot with little resistance and recoil when the trigger was pulled. The trigger nut also had a long vertical spine that could be used like a primitive rear sight for elevation adjustment, which allowed precision shooting over longer distances. The Qin and Han dynasty-era crossbow was also an early example of a modular design, as the bronze trigger components were also mass-produced with relatively precise tolerances so that the parts were interchangeable between different crossbows. The trigger mechanism from one crossbow can be installed into another simply by dropping into a tiller slot of the same specifications and secured with dowel pins. Some crossbow designs were also found to be fitted with bronze buttplates and trigger guard.

It is clear from surviving inventory lists in Gansu and Xinjiang that the crossbow was greatly favored by the Han dynasty. For example, in one batch of slips there are only two mentions of bows, but thirty mentions of crossbows. Crossbows were mass-produced in state armories with designs improving as time went on, such as the use of a mulberry wood stock and brass. Such crossbows during the Song Dynasty in 1068 AD could pierce a tree at 140 paces. Crossbows were used in numbers as large as 50,000 starting from the Qin dynasty and upwards of several hundred thousand during the Han. According to one authority, the crossbow had become "nothing less than the standard weapon of the Han armies", by the second century BC. Han soldiers were required to arm a crossbow with a draw weight equivalent of 76 kg (168 lb) to qualify as an entry-level crossbowman, while it was claimed that a few elite troops were capable of arming crossbows with a draw-weight in excess of 340 kg (750 lb) by the hands-and-feet method.

After the Han dynasty, the crossbow lost favor during the Six Dynasties, until it experienced a mild resurgence during the Tang dynasty, under which the ideal expeditionary army of 20,000 included 2,200 archers and 2,000 crossbowmen. Li Jing and Li Quan prescribed 20 percent of the infantry to be armed with crossbows.

During the Song dynasty, the crossbow received a huge upsurge in military usage, and often overshadowed the bow 2 to 1 in numbers. During this time period, a stirrup was added for ease of loading. The Song government attempted to restrict the public use of crossbows and sought ways to keep both body armor and crossbows out of civilian ownership. Despite the ban on certain types of crossbows, the weapon experienced an upsurge in civilian usage as both a hunting weapon and pastime. The "romantic young people from rich families, and others who had nothing particular to do" formed crossbow-shooting clubs as a way to pass time.

Military crossbows were armed by treading, or basically placing the feet on the bow stave and drawing it using one's arms and back muscles. During the Song dynasty, stirrups were added for ease of drawing and to mitigate damage to the bow. Alternatively, the bow could also be drawn by a belt claw attached to the waist, but this was done lying down, as was the case for all large crossbows. Winch-drawing was used for the large mounted crossbows as seen below, but evidence for its use in Chinese hand-crossbows is scant.

=== Southeast Asia ===
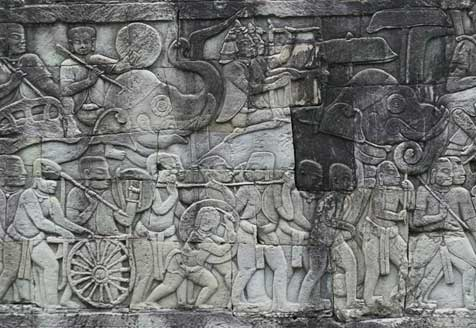
Wheelmounted and elephantmounted double-bow-arcuballistae in the Khmer army, possibly Cham mercenaries

Around the third century BC, King An Dương of Âu Lạc (modern-day northern Vietnam and modern-day southern China) commissioned a man named Cao Lỗ (or Cao Thông) to construct a crossbow and christened it "Saintly Crossbow of the Supernaturally Luminous Golden Claw" (nỏ thần), which could kill 300 men in one shot. According to historian Keith Taylor, the crossbow, along with the word for it, seems to have been introduced into China from Austroasiatic peoples in the south around the fourth century BC. However, this is contradicted by crossbow locks found in ancient Chinese Zhou dynasty tombs dating to the 600s BC.

In 315 AD, Nu Wen taught the Chams how to build fortifications and use crossbows. The Chams would later give the Chinese crossbows as presents on at least one occasion.

Crossbow technology for crossbows with more than one prod was transferred from the Chinese to Champa, which Champa used in its invasion of the Khmer Empire's Angkor in 1177. When the Chams sacked Angkor they used the Chinese siege crossbow. The Chinese taught the Chams how to use crossbows and mounted archery Crossbows and archery in 1171. The Khmer also had double-bow crossbows mounted on elephants, which Michel Jacq-Hergoualc'h suggests were elements of Cham mercenaries in Jayavarman VII's army.

The native Montagnards of Vietnam's Central Highlands were also known to have used crossbows, as both a tool for hunting, and later an effective weapon against the Viet Cong during the Vietnam War. Montagnard fighters armed with crossbows proved a highly valuable asset to the US Special Forces operating in Vietnam, and it was not uncommon for the Green Berets to integrate Montagnard crossbowmen into their strike teams.

=== Ancient Greece ===
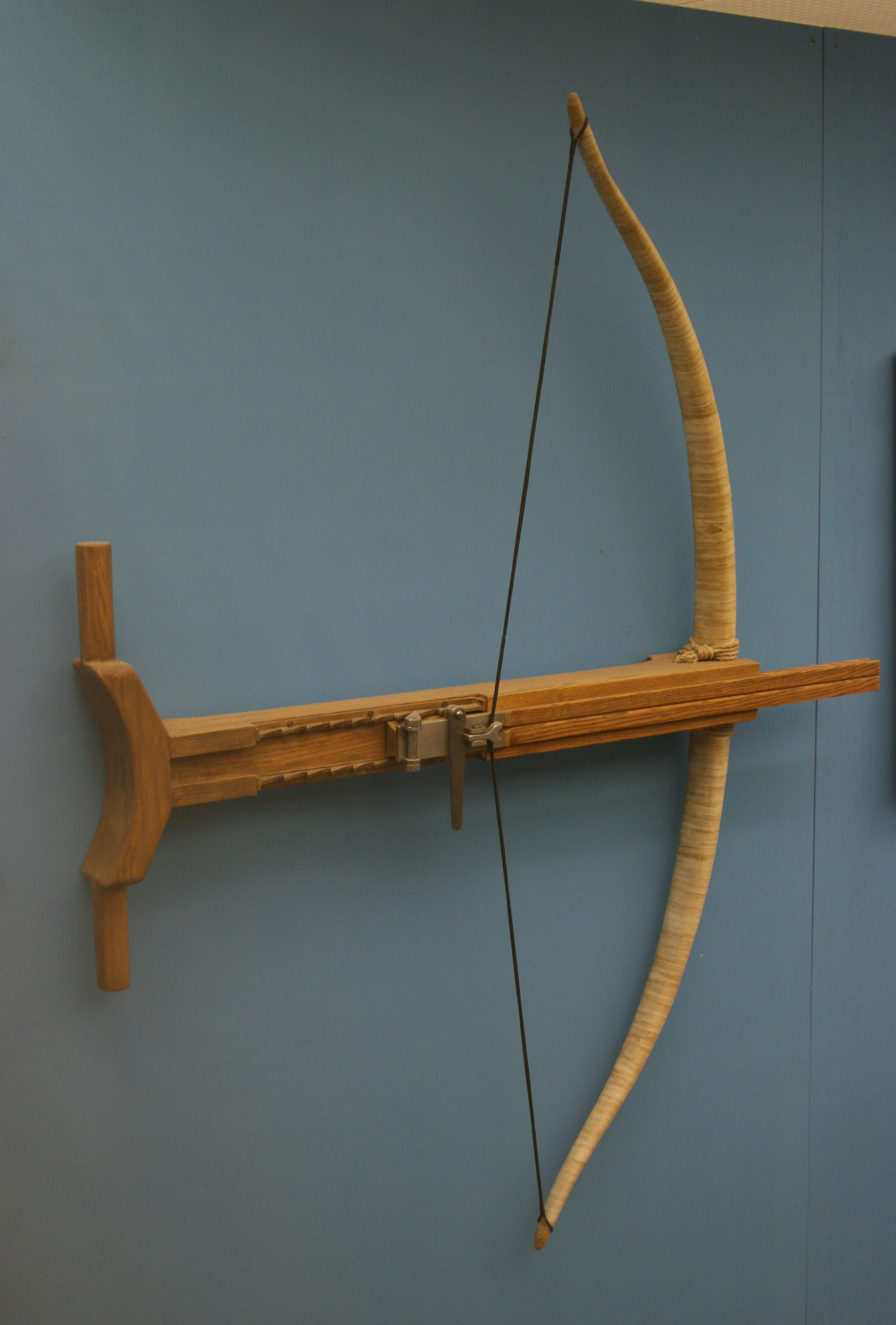
Greek gastraphetes

The earliest crossbow-like weapons in Europe probably emerged around the late 5th century BC when the gastraphetes, an ancient Greek crossbow, appeared. The name means "belly-bow"; the concave withdrawal rest at one end of the stock was placed against the belly of the operator, and he could press it to withdraw the slider before attaching a string to the trigger and loading the bolt; this could store more energy than Greek bows. The device was described by the Greek author Heron of Alexandria in his Belopoeica ("On Catapult-making"), which draws on an earlier account of his compatriot engineer Ctesibius (fl. 285–222 BC). According to Heron, the gastraphetes was the forerunner of the later catapult, which places its invention some unknown time prior to 399 BC. The gastraphetes was a crossbow mounted on a stock divided into a lower and upper section. The lower was a case fixed to the bow, and the upper was a slider which had the same dimensions as the case. It was used in the Siege of Motya in 397 BC. This was a key Carthaginian stronghold in Sicily, as described in the 1st century AD by Heron of Alexandria in his book Belopoeica.

A crossbow machine, the oxybeles was in use from 375 BC to around 340 BC, when the torsion principle replaced the tension crossbow mechanism. Other arrow-shooting machines such as the larger ballista and smaller scorpio from around 338 BC are torsion catapults and are not considered crossbows. Arrow-shooting machines (katapeltai) are briefly mentioned by Aeneas Tacticus in his treatise on siegecraft written around 350 BC. An Athenian inventory from 330 to 329 BC includes catapults bolts with heads and flights. Arrow-shooting machines in action are reported from Philip II's siege of Perinthos in Thrace in 340 BC. At the same time, Greek fortifications began to feature high towers with shuttered windows in the top, presumably to house anti-personnel arrow shooters, as in Aigosthena.

=== Ancient Rome ===
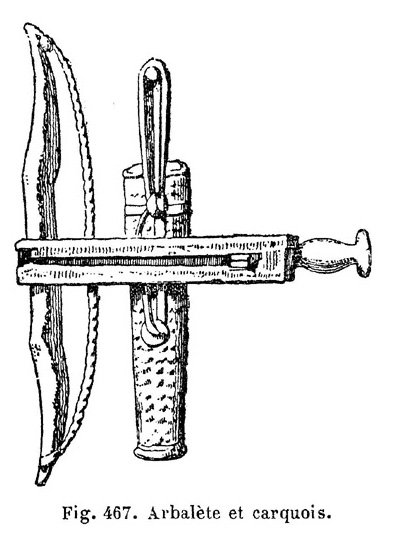
A crossbow based on depictions from a Roman grave in Gaul.

The late 4th century author Vegetius, in his De Re Militari, describes arcubalistarii (crossbowmen) working together with archers and artillerymen. However it is disputed whether arcuballistas were crossbows or torsion-powered weapons. The idea that the arcuballista was a crossbow is due to Vegetius referring separately to it and the manuballista, which was torsion powered. Therefore, if the arcuballista was not like the manuballista, it may have been a crossbow. According to Vegetius these were well-known devices and hence he did not describe them in depth. Joseph Needham argues against the existence of Roman crossbowmen:

On the textual side, there is almost nothing but passing references in the military historian Vegetius (fl. + 386) to 'manuballistae' and 'arcuballistae' which he said he must decline to describe as they were so well known. His decision was highly regrettable, as no other author of the time makes any mention of them at all. Perhaps the best supposition is that the crossbow was primarily known in late European antiquity as a hunting weapon, and received only local use in certain units of the armies of Theodosius I, with which Vegetius happened to be acquainted.

— Joseph Needham

On the other hand Arrian's earlier Ars Tactica, from about 136 AD, also mentions 'missiles shot not from a bow but from a machine' and that this machine was used on horseback while in full gallop. It is presumed that this was a crossbow.

The only pictorial evidence of Roman arcuballistas comes from sculptural reliefs in Roman Gaul depicting them in hunting scenes. Dating to the 2nd century AD, their weapons are aesthetically similar to both the Greek and Chinese crossbow but it is not clear what kind of release mechanism they used. Archaeological evidence suggests they were similar to the rolling nut mechanism of medieval Europe.

=== Medieval Europe ===
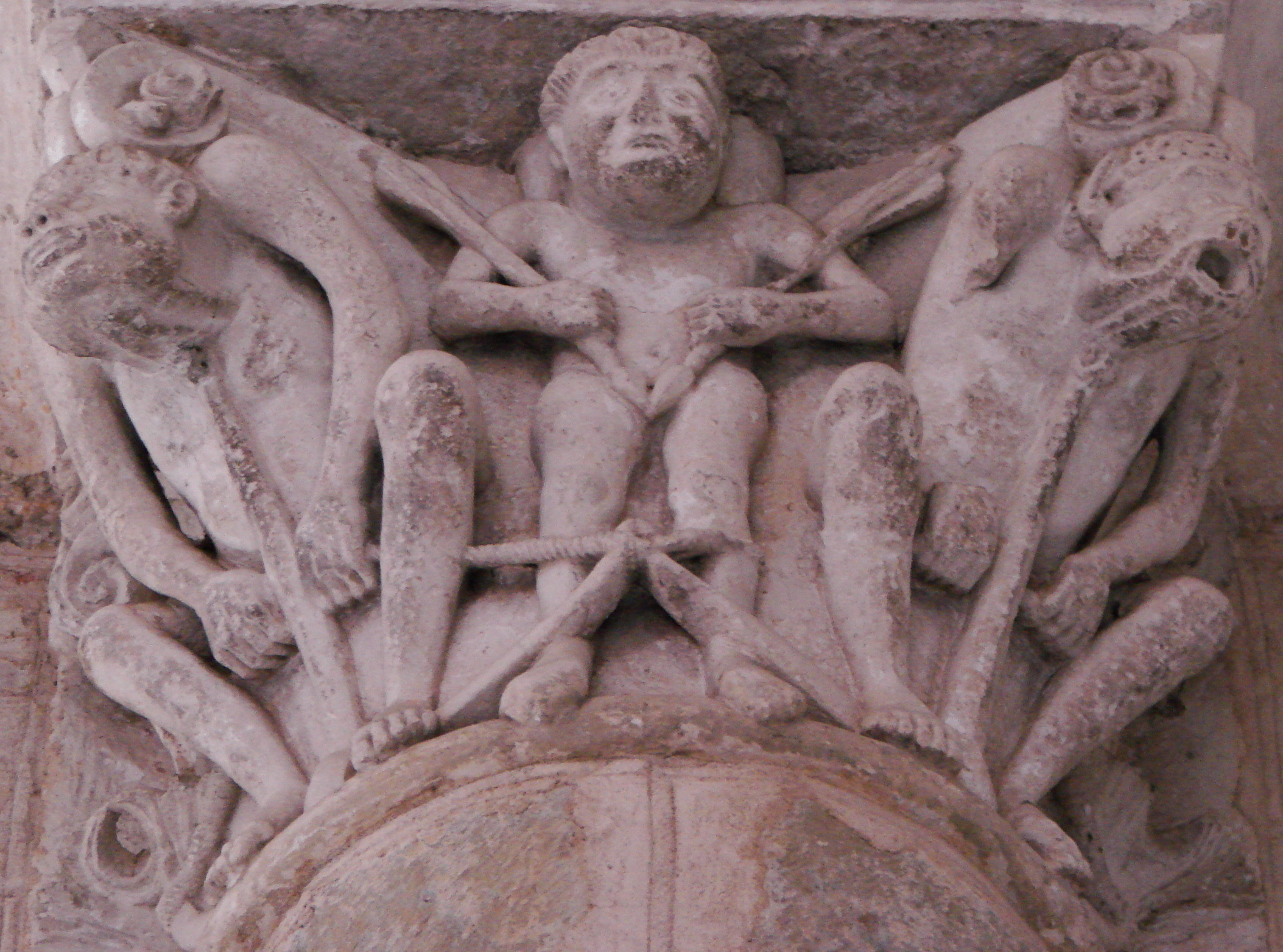
Capital sculpture in the Basilica of Saint-Sernin depicting two primitive crossbows without stirrups, early 12th century

There are essentially no references to the crossbow in Europe from the 5th until the 10th century. There is however a depiction of a crossbow as a hunting weapon on four Pictish stones from early medieval Scotland (6th to 9th centuries): St. Vigeans no. 1, Glenferness, Shandwick, and Meigle.

The crossbow reappeared again in 947 as a French weapon during the siege of Senlis and again in 984 at the siege of Verdun. Crossbows were used at the battle of Hastings in 1066, and by the 12th century they had become common battlefield weapons. The earliest extant European crossbow remains were found at Lake Paladru, dated to the 11th century.

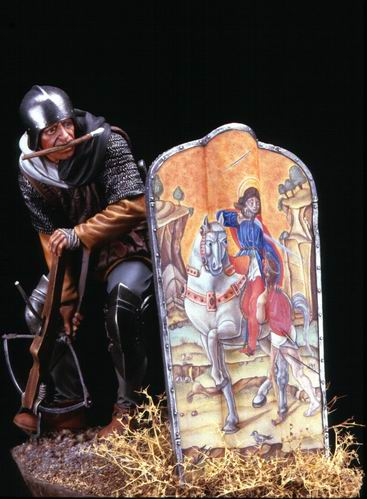
A model of a medieval crossbowman drawing his bow behind his pavise. A hook on the end of a strap on his belt engages the bowstring. Holding the crossbow down by putting his foot through the stirrup, he draws the bow by straightening his legs

The crossbow superseded hand bows in many European armies during the 12th century, except in England, where the longbow was more popular. Later crossbows (sometimes referred to as arbalests), utilizing all-steel prods, were able to achieve power close (and sometime superior) to longbows but were more expensive to produce and slower to reload because they required the aid of mechanical devices such as the cranequin or windlass to draw back their extremely heavy bows. Usually these could shoot only two bolts per minute versus twelve or more with a skilled archer, often necessitating the use of a pavise (shield) to protect the operator from enemy fire. Along with polearm weapons made from farming equipment, the crossbow was also a weapon of choice for insurgent peasants such as the Taborites. Genoese crossbowmen were famous mercenaries hired throughout medieval Europe, whilst the crossbow also played an important role in anti-personnel defense of ships.

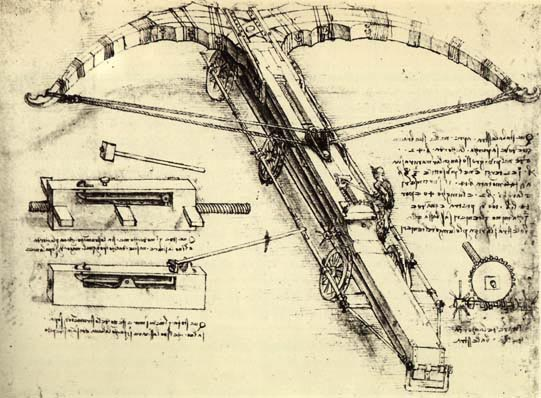
Sketch by Leonardo da Vinci, c. 1500

Crossbows were eventually replaced in warfare by gunpowder weapons. Early hand cannons had slower rates of fire and much worse accuracy than contemporary crossbows, but the arquebus (which proliferated in the mid to late 15th century) matched crossbows' rate of fire while being far more powerful. The Battle of Cerignola in 1503 was won by Spain largely through the use of matchlock arquebuses, marking the first time a major battle had been won through the use of hand-held firearms. Later, similar competing tactics would feature harquebusiers or musketeers in formation with pikemen, pitted against cavalry firing pistols or carbines. While the military crossbow had largely been supplanted by firearms on the battlefield by 1525, the sporting crossbow in various forms remained a popular hunting weapon in Europe until the eighteenth century. The accuracy of late 15th century crossbows compares well with modern handguns, based on records of shooting competitions in German cities. Crossbows saw irregular use throughout the rest of the 16th century; for example, Maria Pita's husband was killed by a crossbowman of the English Armada in 1589.

=== Islamic world ===
There are no references to crossbows in Islamic texts earlier than the 14th century. Arabs in general were averse to the crossbow and considered it a foreign weapon. They called it qaus al-rijl (foot-drawn bow), qaus al-zanbūrak (bolt bow) and qaus al-faranjīyah (Frankish bow). Although Muslims did have crossbows, there seems to be a split between eastern and western types. Muslims in Spain used the typical European trigger, while eastern Muslim crossbows had a more complex trigger mechanism.

Mamluk cavalry used crossbows.

=== Elsewhere and later ===
Oyumi were ancient Japanese artillery pieces that first appeared in the seventh century (during the Asuka period). According to Japanese records, the Oyumi was different from the handheld crossbow also in use during the same time period. A quote from a seventh-century source seems to suggest that the Oyumi may have able to fire multiple arrows at once: "the Oyumi were lined up and fired at random, the arrows fell like rain". A ninth-century Japanese artisan named Shimaki no Fubito claimed to have improved on a version of the weapon used by the Chinese; his version could rotate and fire projectiles in multiple directions. The last recorded use of the Oyumi was in 1189.

In West and Central Africa, crossbows served as a scouting weapon and for hunting, with African slaves bringing this technology to natives in America. In the Southern United States, the crossbow was used for hunting and warfare when firearms or gunpowder were unavailable because of economic hardships or isolation. In the north of Northern America, light hunting crossbows were traditionally used by the Inuit. These are technologically similar to the African-derived crossbows, but have a different route of influence.

Spanish conquistadors continued to use crossbows in the Americas long after they were replaced in European battlefields by firearms. Only in the 1570s, did firearms become completely dominant among the Spanish in the Americas.

The French and the British used a crossbow-like Sauterelle (French for grasshopper) in World War I. It was lighter and more portable than the Leach Trench Catapult, but less powerful. It weighed 24 kg (53 lb) and could throw an F1 grenade or Mills bomb 110–140 m (120–150 yd). The Sauterelle replaced the Leach Catapult in British service and was in turn replaced in 1916 by the 2-inch Medium Trench Mortar and Stokes mortar. Early in the war, actual crossbows were pressed into service in small numbers by both French and German troops to launch grenades.

A range of crossbows were developed by the Allied powers during the Second World War for assassinations and covert operations, but none appear to have ever been used in the field. A small number of crossbows were built and used by Australian forces in the New Guinea campaign.

== Modern use ==
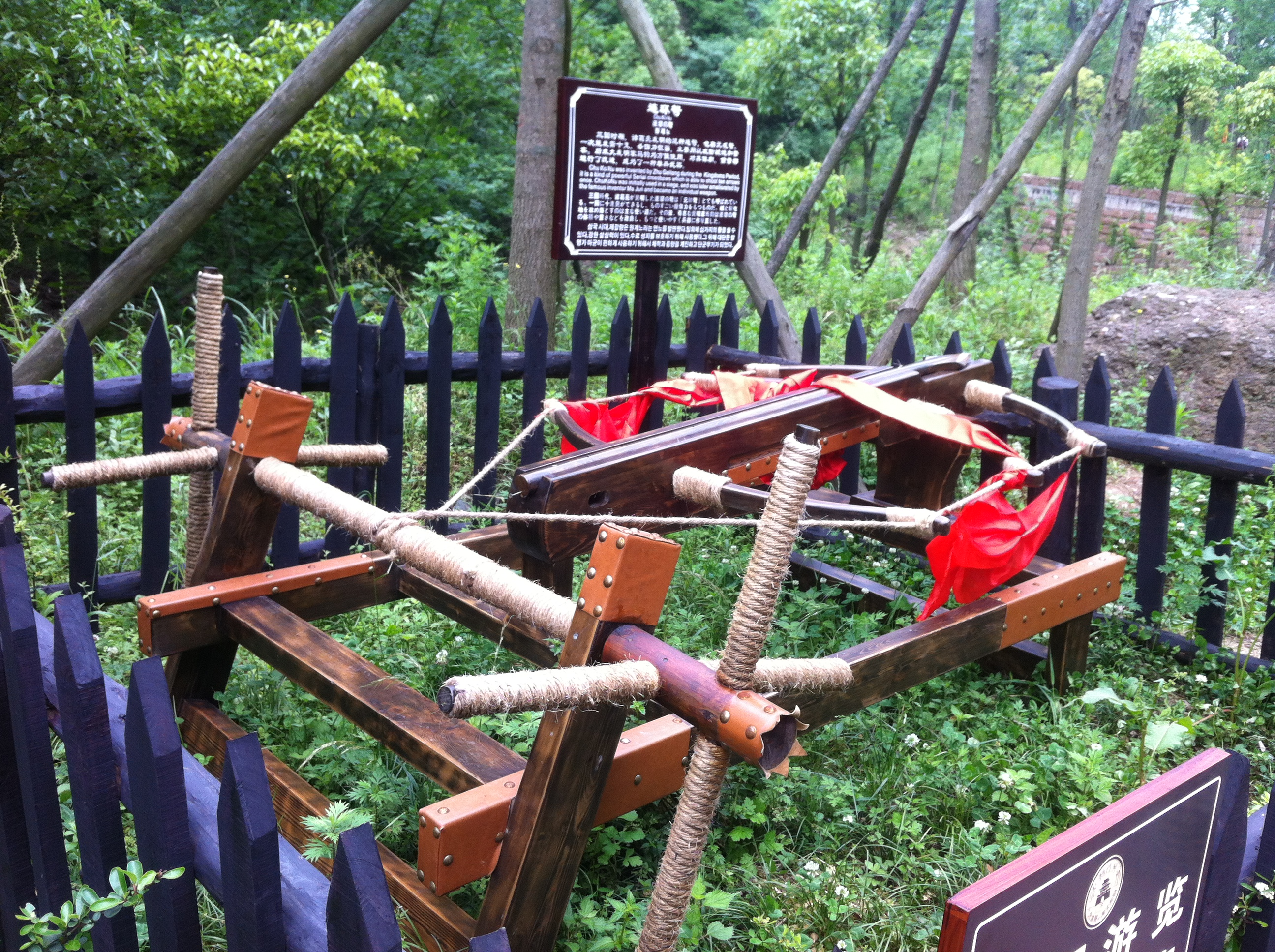
Modern recreation of a mounted triple bow crossbow

=== Hunting, leisure, and science ===
Crossbows are used for shooting sports and bowhunting in modern archery and for blubber biopsy samples in scientific research. In some countries such as Canada, they may be less heavily regulated than firearms, and thus more popular for hunting; some jurisdictions have bow and/or crossbow only seasons.

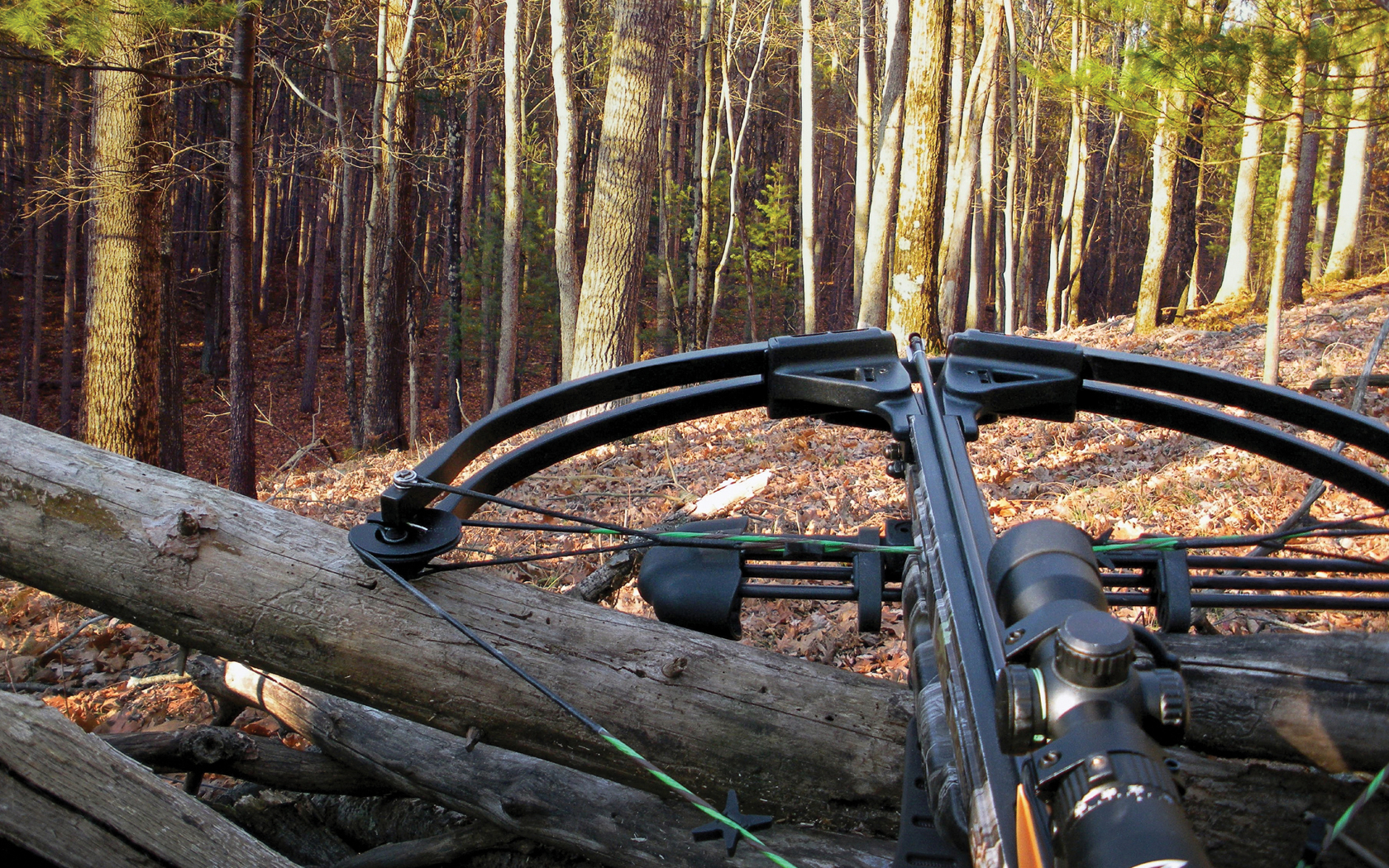
Modern hunting crossbow

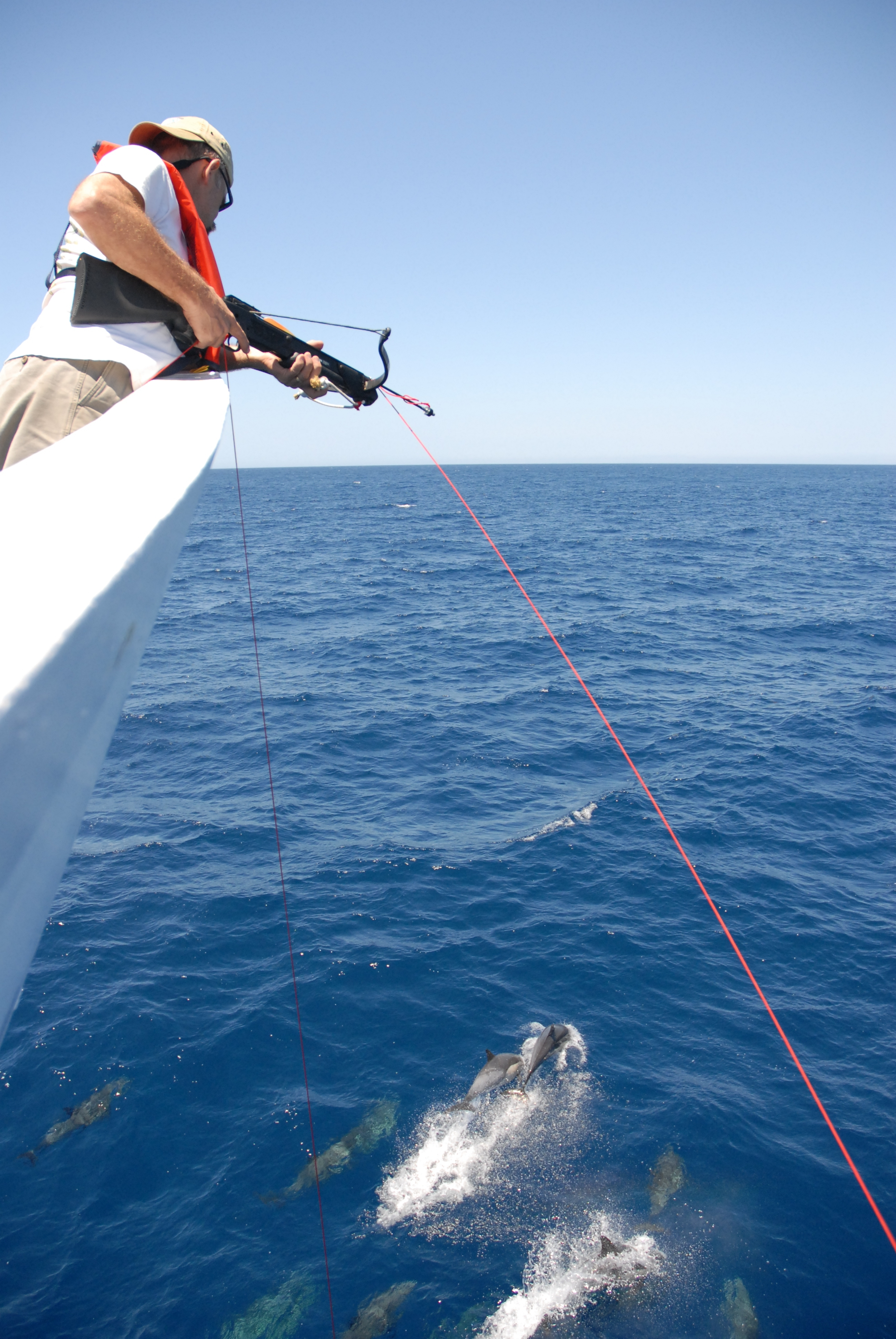
Fisheries scientist obtaining tissue samples from dolphins swimming in the bow wave of a NOAA ship

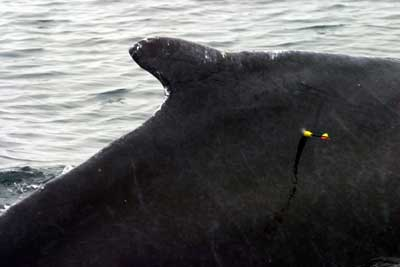
A whale shot by a modified crossbow bolt for a blubber biopsy sample

=== Military and paramilitary ===
Crossbows are no longer used in battles, but they are still used in some military applications. For example, there is an undated photograph of Peruvian soldiers equipped with crossbows and rope to establish a zip-line in difficult terrain. In Brazil, the CIGS (Jungle Warfare Training Center) also trains soldiers in the use of crossbows.

In the United States, SAA International Ltd manufacture a 200 J (150 ft⋅lbf) crossbow-launched version of the U.S. Army type classified Launched Grapnel Hook (LGH), among other mine countermeasure solutions designed for the Middle Eastern theatre. It was evaluated as successful in Cambodia and Bosnia. It is used to probe for and detonate tripwire-initiated mines and booby traps at up to 50 m (55 yd). The concept is similar to the LGH device originally fired from a rifle, as a plastic retrieval line is attached. Reusable up to 20 times, the line can be reeled back in without exposing the user. The device is of particular use in tactical situations where noise discipline is important.

In Europe, Barnett International sold crossbows to Serbian forces which, according to The Guardian, were later used "in ambushes and as a counter-sniper weapon" against the Kosovo Liberation Army during the Kosovo War in the areas of Pec and Djakovica, south west of Kosovo. Whitehall launched an investigation, though the Department of Trade and Industry established that not being "on the military list", crossbows were not covered by export restrictions.

Paul Beaver of Jane's Defence Publications commented that,

"They are not only a silent killer, they also have a psychological effect".

On 15 February 2008, Serbian Minister of Defence Dragan Sutanovac was pictured testing a Barnett crossbow during a public exercise of the Serbian Army's Special Forces in Nis, 200 km (120 mi) south of Belgrade. Special forces in both Greece and Turkey also continue to employ the crossbow. Spain's Green Berets still use the crossbow as well. In the 2024 attack on the Israeli embassy in Belgrade the attacker used a crossbow to attack a Serbian gendarme who got wounded in the neck .

In Asia, some Chinese armed forces use crossbows, including the special force Snow Leopard Commando Unit of the People's Armed Police and the People's Liberation Army. One reason for this is the crossbow's ability to stop persons carrying explosives without risk of causing detonation. During the Xinjiang riots of July 2009, Crossbows were used by security forces to suppress rioters. The Indian Navy's MARCOS were equipped until the late 1980s with crossbows with cyanide-tipped bolts, as an alternative to suppressed handguns.

=== Modern arbalists ===
Modern arbalists shoot crossbows markedly different from medieval artillerymen. Current-day target crossbows must conform to various limitations according to the governing body under which the shoot or tournament is taking place. Firstly, GNAS requires that arbalists shoot at targets separate from archers. Both the World Crossbow Shooting Association (WCSA) and GNAS require that the draw weight maximum be 95 lbs and that the minimum bolt (arrow) length be 12 inches. These organizations differ, however, in allowable maximum bolt length, GNAS citing 15", WCSA 18". They also disagree as to whether metal prods can be used; GNAS says no, WCSA says yes (with restrictions). Both require that the bolts shall be fletched, GNAS imposing an additional constraint of the number of fletchings (three). GNAS (now Archery GB) recognizes three grades of arbalist:

The World Crossbow Shooting Association (WCSA) makes available four sets of Star Achievement Awards (badges) to encourage both participation in tournaments and to provide recognition for reaching certain scores: TC 900 for outdoor target crossbow, SC 600 for outdoor sport crossbow, Indoor 40 for indoor 40 cm face for both target and sport crossbow, and Indoor 25 for indoor 25 cm face for both target and sport crossbow.

== Comparison to conventional bows ==
With a crossbow, archers could release a draw force far in excess of what they could have handled with a bow.

Furthermore, the crossbow could hold the tension indefinitely, whereas even the strongest longbowman could only hold a drawn bow for a short time. The ease of use of a crossbow allows it to be used effectively with little training, while other types of bows take far more skill to shoot accurately.

The disadvantage is the greater weight and clumsiness to reload compared to a bow, as well as the slower rate of shooting and the lower efficiency of the acceleration system, but there would be reduced elastic hysteresis, making the crossbow a more accurate weapon.

Medieval European crossbows had a much smaller draw length than bows, so that for the same energy to be imparted to the projectile the crossbow had to have a much higher draw weight.

A direct comparison between a fast hand-drawn replica crossbow and a longbow shows a 6:10 rate of shooting or a 4:9 rate within 30 seconds and comparable weapons.

== Legislation ==
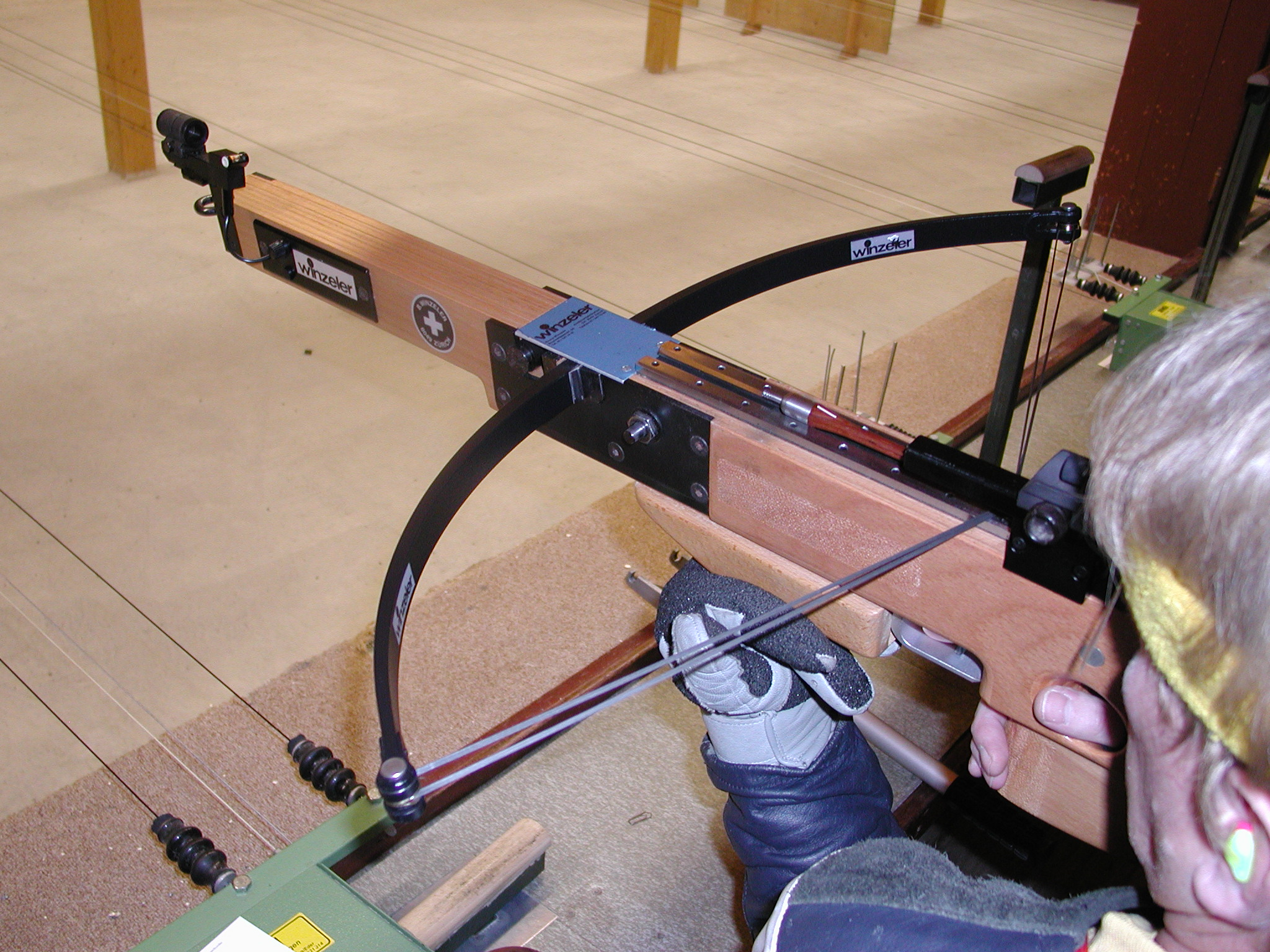
Modern competition crossbow

Today, the crossbow often has a complicated legal status due to the possibility of lethal use and its similarities to both firearms and bows. While some jurisdictions treat crossbows in the same way as firearms, many others do not require any sort of license to own a crossbow. The legality of using a crossbow for hunting varies widely in different jurisdictions.

== See also ==
- Master of Crossbowmen
- Match crossbow
- Modern competitive archery
- Speargun
- Target archery
- Bow and arrow
- Archery
