= Slingshot =

Hand-powered projectile weapon

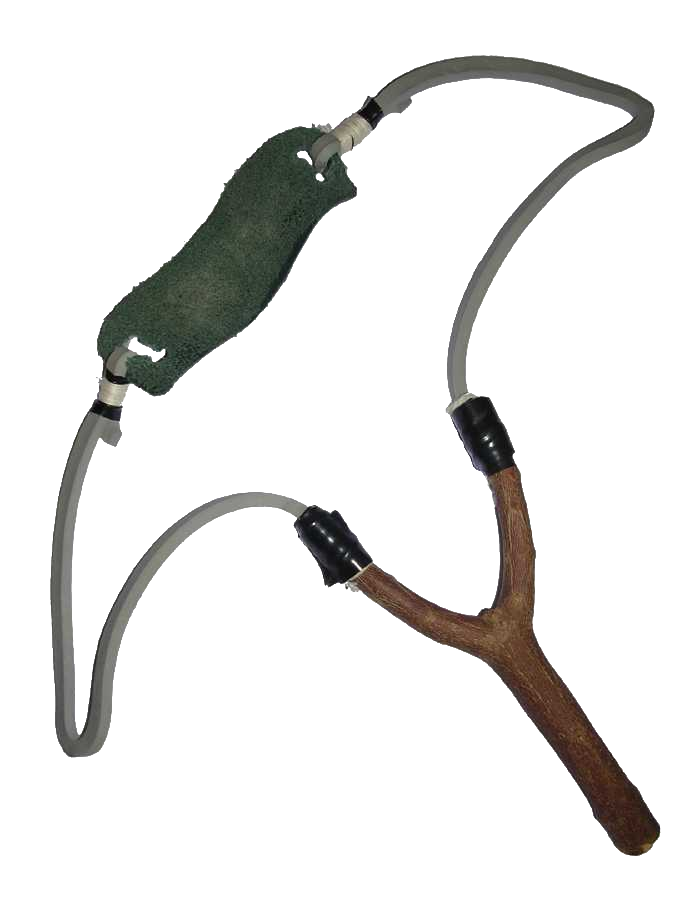
Simple slingshot

A slingshot is a small hand-powered projectile weapon. The classic form consists of a Y-shaped frame, with two tubes or strips made from either a natural rubber or synthetic elastic material. These are attached to the upper two ends. The other ends of the strips lead back to a pouch that holds the projectile. One hand holds the frame, while the other hand grasps the pocket and draws it back to the desired extent to provide power for the projectile—up to a full span of the arms with sufficiently long bands.

Other names include catapult (United Kingdom), peashooter (United States), gulel (India), kettie (South Africa), or ging, shanghai, pachoonga (Australia and New Zealand).

== Use and history ==
Slingshots depend on strong elastic materials for their projectile firepower, typically vulcanized natural rubber or the equivalent such as silicone rubber tubing, and thus date no earlier than the invention of vulcanized rubber by Charles Goodyear in 1839 (patented in 1844). By 1860, this "new engine" had established a reputation for use by juveniles in vandalism. For much of their early history, slingshots were a "do-it-yourself" item, typically made from a forked branch to form the Y-shaped handle, with rubber strips sliced from items such as inner tubes or other sources of dogwood sticks to take small game at ranges of up to 9 m (30 ft) with No. 0 lead buckshot (8 mm [0.32 in] diameter).

The Wham-O company, founded in 1948, produced the Wham-O slingshot. It was made of ash wood and used flat rubber bands. The Wham-O was suitable for hunting, with a draw weight of up to 200 newtons (45 pounds-force), and was available with an arrow rest.

The National Slingshot Association was founded in the 1940s, headquartered in San Marino, California. It organised slingshot clubs and competitions nationwide. Despite the slingshot's reputation as a tool of juvenile delinquents, the NSA reported that 80% of slingshot sales were to men over 30 years old, many of them professionals. John Milligan, a part-time manufacturer of the aluminium-framed John Milligan Special, a hunting slingshot, reported that about a third of his customers were physicians.

Slingshots are also occasionally used in angling to disperse bait over an area of water, so that fish may be attracted.

A home-made derivative of a slingshot also exists, consisting of a rubber balloon cut in half and tied to a tubular object such as the neck of a plastic bottle, or a small pipe. The projectile is inserted through the tube and into the cut balloon, and the user stretches the balloon to launch the projectile. These so-called "balloon guns" are sometimes made as a substitute to ordinary slingshot, and are often used to create a "shotgun" effect with several projectiles fired at once.

In modern times the slingshot has been used by civilians against governments. Examples of this are Hong Kong during the 2019-2020 protests where they were used against the Hong Kong Police Force, by the Palestinians against Israeli forces. and by the Ukrainians during the Maidan Revolution in 2014.

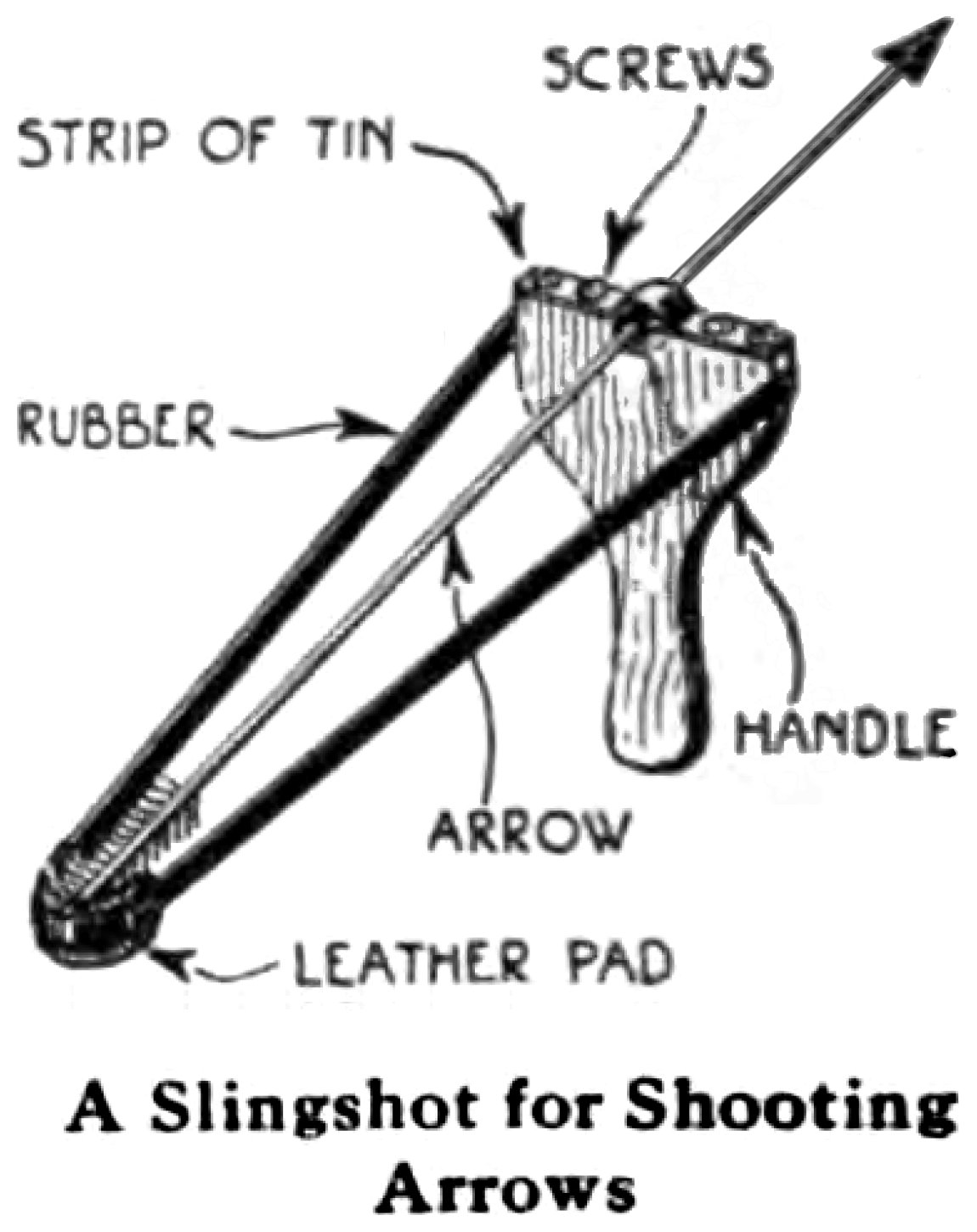
A 1922 diagram showing the construction of an arrow-firing slingshot

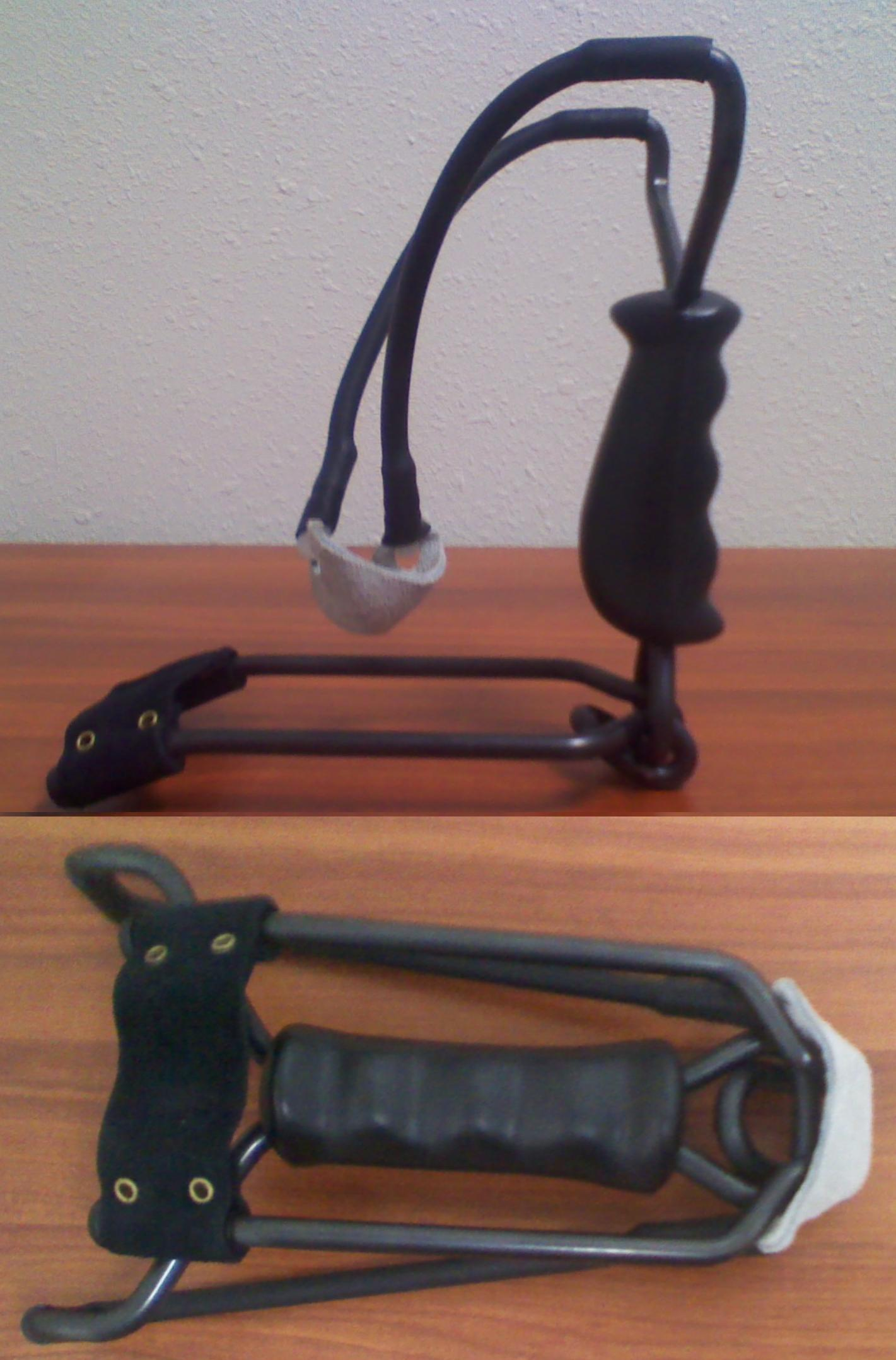
A folding, steel framed wrist brace slingshot using tubular bands.

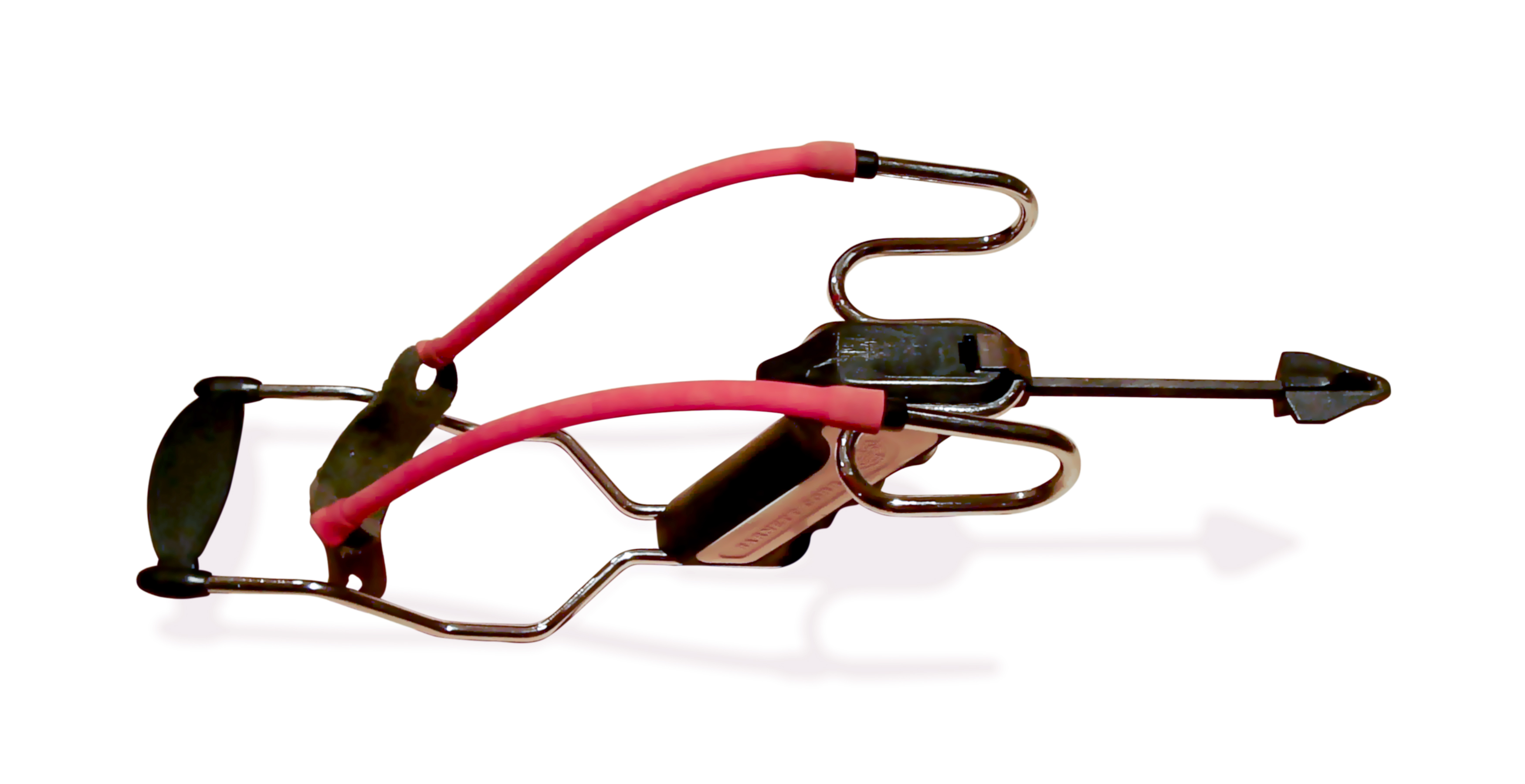
Modern slingshot with ergonomic grip (center), arm support (left), stabiliser and sight (right)

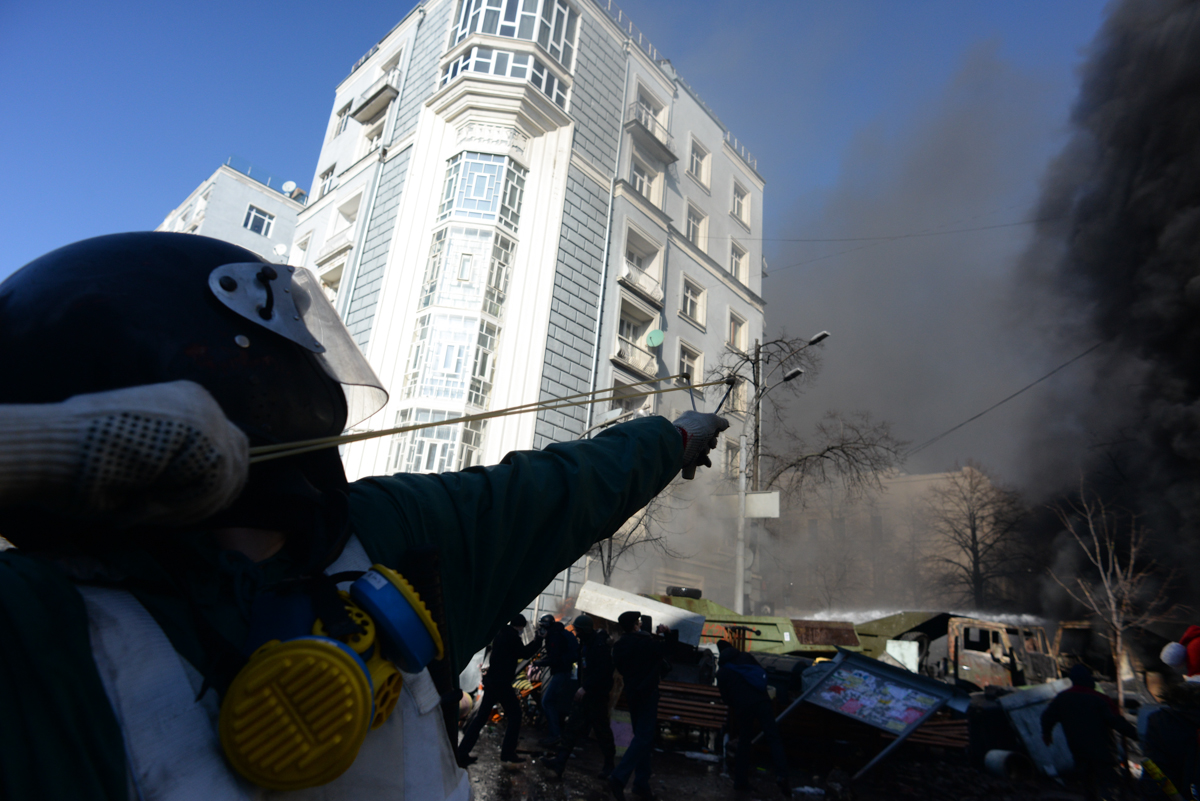
Helmeted combatant fires a slingshot during clashes on February 18, 2014, in Kyiv, Ukraine

== Military use ==
Slingshots have been used as military weapons, but primarily by guerrilla forces due to the easily available resources and technology required to construct one. Such guerrilla groups included the Irish Republican Army; prior to the 2003 invasion of Iraq, Saddam Hussein released a propaganda video demonstrating slingshots as a possible insurgency weapon for use against invading forces.

Slingshots have also been used by the United States military to launch unmanned aerial vehicles (UAVs). Two crew members form the fork, with an elastic cord stretched between them to provide power to launch the small aircraft.

On the Battle of Marawi, the soldiers of the Philippine Army's elite Scout Rangers were observed using slingshots with grenades as an improvised mortar to attack Maute and Abu Sayyaf forces.

== Sport ==
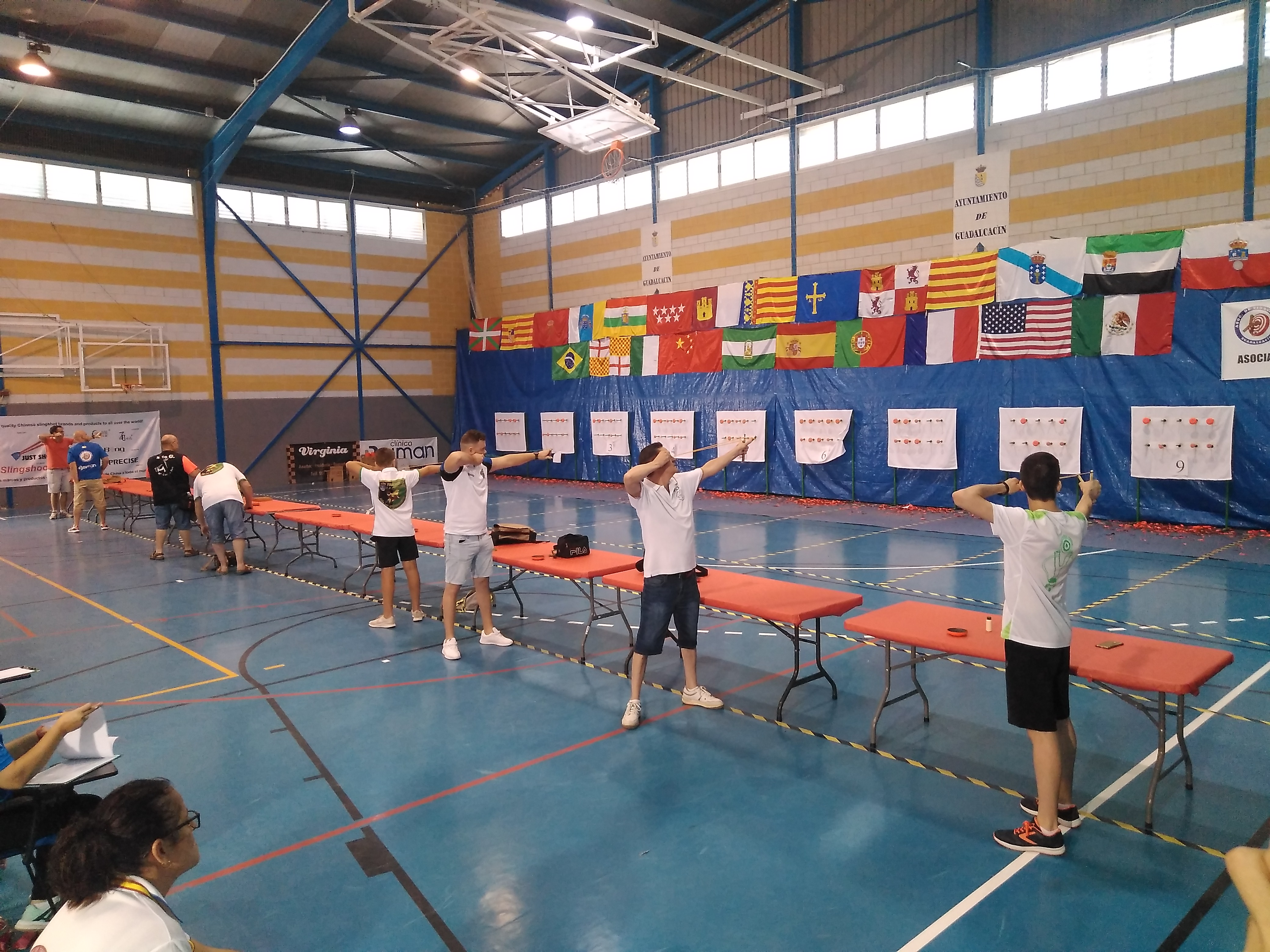
Slingshot competition in Spain

There are championships, both regional and international, that are quite popular in Spain and are organized by the Spanish Association of Sports Slingshots (Spanish: Asociación Española de Tirachinas Deportivo). There are also ones in Italy and China. Each participant is placed ten metres away from the target, which is the international standard.

== Dangers ==
One of the dangers inherent in slingshots is the high probability that the bands will fail. Most bands are made from latex, which degrades with time and use, causing the bands to eventually fail under load. Failures at the pouch end are safest, as they result in the band rebounding away from the user. Failures at the fork end, however, send the band back towards the shooter's face, which can cause eye and facial injuries. One method to minimize the chance of a fork end failure is to utilize a tapered band, thinner at the pouch end, and thicker and stronger at the fork end. Designs that use loose parts at the fork are the most dangerous, as they can result in those parts being propelled back towards the shooter's face, such as the ball attachment used in the recalled Daisy "Natural" line of slingshots (see image). The band could slip out of the slot in which it rested, and the hard ball in the tube resulted in cases of blindness and broken teeth. Daisy models using plain tubular bands were not covered in the recall, because the elastic tubing does not cause severe injuries upon failure. Another big danger is the fork breakage; some commercial slingshots made from cheap zinc alloy may break and severely injure shooters' eyes and face.

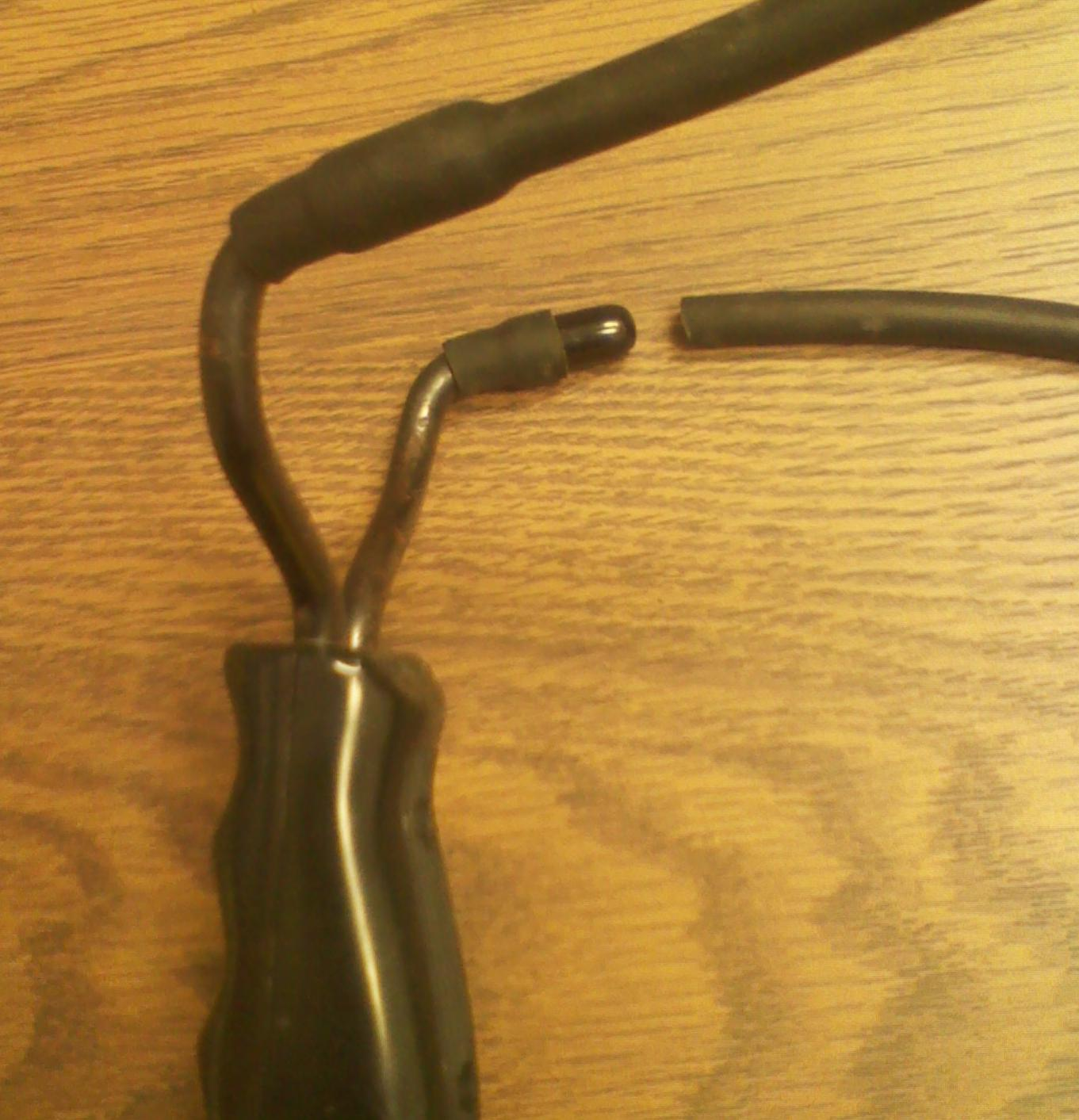
A tubular band slingshot showing a band failure at the fork.

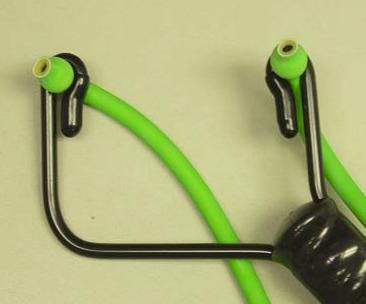
The ball-in-band attachment method used by the recalled Daisy "Natural" line of slingshots.

== Legal issues ==
Many jurisdictions prohibit the use of arm-braced slingshots. For example New York Penal law 265.01 defines it as a Class-4 misdemeanor, and in some states of Australia they are also a prohibited weapon.

== See also ==
- Bow and arrow
- Crossbow
- Dart gun
- Bullet-shooting crossbow
- Harpoon
- Polespear
- Hawaiian sling
- Sling
- Catapult
- Trebuchet
- Projectile
- Hangung
