= Speargun =

Underwater fishing implement

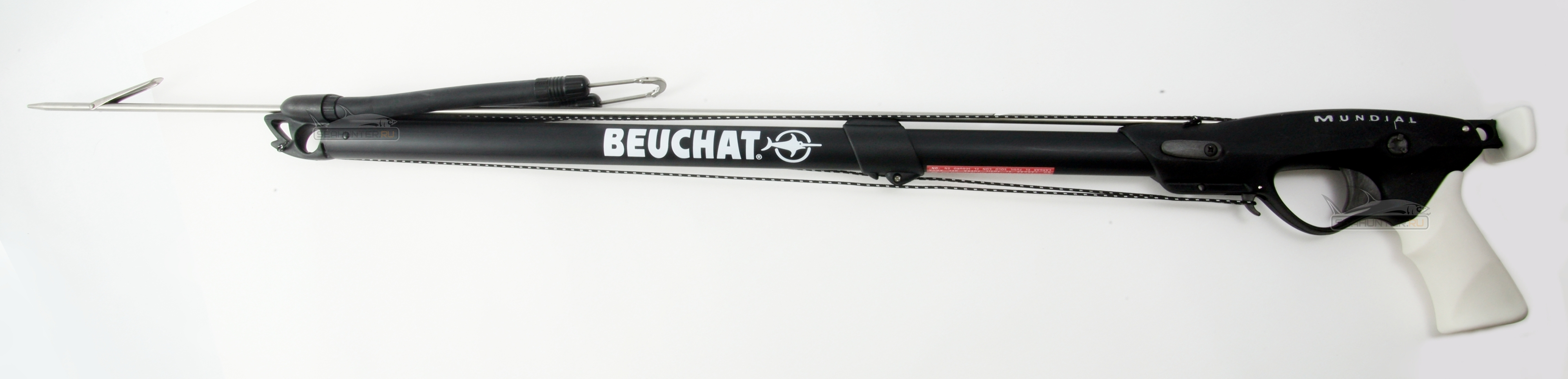
Speargun

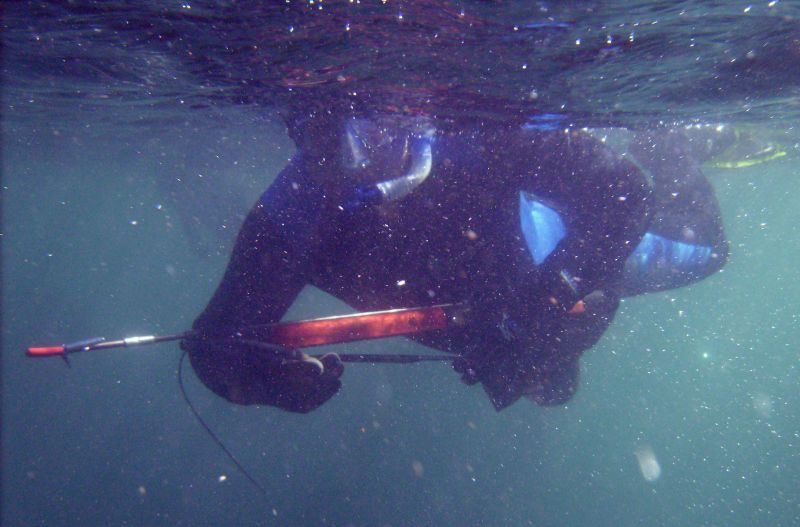
Speargun in use by a diver

A speargun is a ranged underwater fishing device designed to launch a tethered spear or harpoon to impale fish or other marine animals and targets. Spearguns are used in sport fishing and underwater target shooting. The two basic types are pneumatic and elastic (powered by rubber bands). Spear types come in a number of varieties including threaded, break-away and lined. Floats and buoys are common accessories when targeting larger fish.

== Components ==
The basic components of a speargun are a spear, a stock or barrel, and a handle or grip containing a trigger mechanism. Spearguns are usually from 0.5 to 2 metres (1.6 to 6.6 ft) long, round or roughly rectangular from 28 to 75 mm (1.1 to 3.0 in) in diameter/width.

== Types of spearguns ==
Spearguns are, most often, divided according to propulsion method, with the two common variants being rubber (or band) powered, and air powered (pneumatic).

Band-powered spearguns, which are the simplest and cheapest to maintain, with rubber being the predominant material, come in two types: those made from wood (often referred to as a Hawaiian sling), and those of sealed tubing metal or composite and/or a combination of these materials construction: referred to as the stock or barrel respectively.

Spearguns of the tubular barrel variety have separate "muzzles" fitting in or over one end of the tube, for attaching the rubber bands; while others (usually those made of wood), mainly have the bands passing through a horizontal slot in the stock.

A rubber-powered speargun, besides the barrel, has the following parts:

- A spear (being a steel shaft slightly longer than the stock/barrel of from 6–10 millimetres (0.2–0.4 in) in diameter, which lies on top of the barrel or in a track or groove on the top), and a trigger mechanism to engage the spear (usually in or near a handle or grip at or near the rear) to keep the gun in a loaded state of readiness when it is loaded.
- Such loading is from one or more latex rubber bands (usually tubing) – which provide the propelling force – and are about one third of the barrel length and from 9–20 millimetres (0.4–0.8 in) in diameter, being attached to the front of the gun.
- The ends of these bands have 'bridles' or 'wishbones', (which are usually metal or synthetic cord) fitted to them and when these bands are pulled by the diver to engage the 'wishbones' in notches in the spear or 'fins' welded on the top at the rear just before the trigger, the gun is loaded.

A pneumatic gun differs from a rubber model in that it has a thicker spear that goes inside a sealed internal barrel encased in a hollow sealed outer casing that contains the air which is at ambient pressure until it is pumped up by hand to a pressure usually equal to one strong rubber band. The trigger mechanism (which is at the back of the gun) has a handle/grip below it or midway up the gun. Once at the required pressure the spear is forced down the barrel to engage the trigger mechanism and is then loaded and ready. There will usually be a strong line at least twice the length of the gun connecting the spear to the front of the gun. When loaded great caution must be exercised as the speargun is now a dangerous weapon. Without a trigger, rubber bands or air pressure the speargun cannot be loaded and therefore cannot function.

== Uses of spearguns ==
=== Proper uses ===
- Sport spearfishing
- In tropical seas, some natives spearfish for a living, often using a home-made snorkelling kit
- Underwater target shooting

All spearguns have a trigger mechanism that holds a spear in place along the barrel.

Traditionally, rear-handle spearguns are popular in Europe and mid-handle guns were used in North America, however as spearfishing has developed as an international sport these distinctions have blurred.

South African speargun manufacturers have improved speargun designs with the use of a rail along the barrel that prevents the spear from flexing under pressure from the rubber bands.

=== Improper uses ===
- Spearguns have also been used as a weapon in a manner similar to a crossbow, usually far from water, and by assailants who use them in desperation to avoid the regulation of traditional firearms or the requirements of an archery or crossbow license; nominally, only a spearfishing license is required to possess one.
  - The planned hijacking of Federal Express Flight 705.
  - The 2004 Sharpe family murders in Australia.

=== Accessories ===
The speargun can have:

- Buoy or float, tethered to the speargun or directly to the spear. It helps to subdue large fish. It can also assist in storing fish, but is more importantly used as a safety device to warn boat drivers there is a diver in the area.
- Floatline, connecting the buoy to the speargun. Often made from woven plastic, they can also be a mono-filament encased in an airtight plastic tube, or made from stretchable bungee cord.

== Spear shaft types ==
=== Threaded ===
Threaded shafts allow for different tips to be used by having them screw on or off. Some tips include a basic short tip with a folding flopper and others use longer tips with a rotating feature, usually with multiple floppers. When larger fish are targeted a break-away tip is recommended (not to be confused with the break-away setup below) as it allows some portion, usually 10–15 centimetres (4–6 in), of the tip to "break-away" from the main shaft after it penetrates a fish allowing the shaft to "fall out" of the fish but maintain the fish connection by either a small steel cable or high-strength spectra or kevlar line.

=== Hawaiian ===
Hawaiian shafts are the simplest shaft as the tip is shaped on the end and a folding barb installed directly behind the tip to keep the fish from sliding off. There are different length barbs and sometimes multiples (sometimes referred to as a Florida rig).

== Speargun setups ==
=== Line rig ===
In this setup, the most common, the speargun is attached to the shaft by a line. The line is usually a heavy monofilament (140–180 kilograms (300–400 lb) test), spectra, or other spectra-like material (braided line) with 180–270+ kg (400–600+ lb) rating. The line wraps around the bottom or side of the gun upon loading and releases via a mechanical release or tension release to allow the line to travel with the spear after firing. There are typically two different methods of connecting the line to the spear shaft, either a slide ring that travels up and down the shaft to machined stopping points or via a hole drilled through some portion of the shaft (usually the rear). This is the most common method for taking fish by speargun and the majority of the other types of setups use the mentioned connection options to the shaft. Some newer setups offer an option to quickly attach line to, or disconnect from, a shaft making for a line or free shaft option on a single speargun.

=== Speed rig ===
Here the spear gun is connected to a buoy via a float rope. After spearing a fish, the spearfisher detaches the float rope and uses a speed stick (a metal spike) attached to the float rope to thread the fish onto the float rope through its gills. The fish will then gradually slide up the float rope as the diver swims until it rests underneath the buoy. When shooting larger fish, the diver can let go of his gun and play the fish from the float line, giving the fish more room to tire and preventing it from tearing off the spear or dragging the spearfisher under the water.

=== Break-away rig ===
Here the spear shaft is connected directly to the buoy. It is loosely fitted to the gun as well while hunting, but after the spear is fired its force of movement detaches the line from the gun. The spearfisher is then able to subdue the fish from the buoy or float line while retaining possession of his gun. This is for two reasons. Firstly, the gun can be used to push off sharks or signal the boat driver, and secondly to prevent loss of the gun should the fish break the line, or should the spearfisher lose grip on the buoy. This setup can be used in conjunction with elastic bungee-style rope and a body board style float with locking cleats. This respectively maintains constant pressure on the fish and allows the spearfisher to rest while being towed around. They can then gather the bungee line as the fish tires and lock it off in order to gradually pull the fish closer.

=== Reel on gun ===
Here the gun has a line reel like on a fishing rod. After spearing a fish, the reel unwinds, allowing the spearfisher room to play the fish. Reel setups are useful when ocean structures such as built up reef or kelp gardens prevent the spearfisher from towing a buoy.

=== Free-shafting ===
Here the spear shaft is not connected to a gun or buoy. This is more commonly associated with spearfishing on scuba where excess cable or line can be problematic. Also it can be used in the areas with exceptionally clear water, where underwater hunter can track his shaft after firing it. It is not used in turbid waters with poor visibility.

=== Riding rig ===
Here, the spear shaft is connected to monofilament or other small high strength line, which is wrapped around the speargun, then connected to a larger, easier to handle rope which the diver holds in his hand. On the larger rope there is a loop on the end big enough for the divers thumb. The rope is placed on the thumb, then wrapped around the back of the hand. In this setup the spear is also totally free from the gun, allowing the diver to work the fish using the large rope, while keeping his gun safe. If the fish is too large to hang on to, the diver can tie it off or release it, only losing his spear and rope. This is used usually when fishing around oil rigs, or other hazardous diving such as hunting larger fish or in poor visibility.

== See also ==
- Hawaiian sling
- Polespear
- Underwater firearm
