= Bullet-shooting crossbow =

Modified crossbow weapon

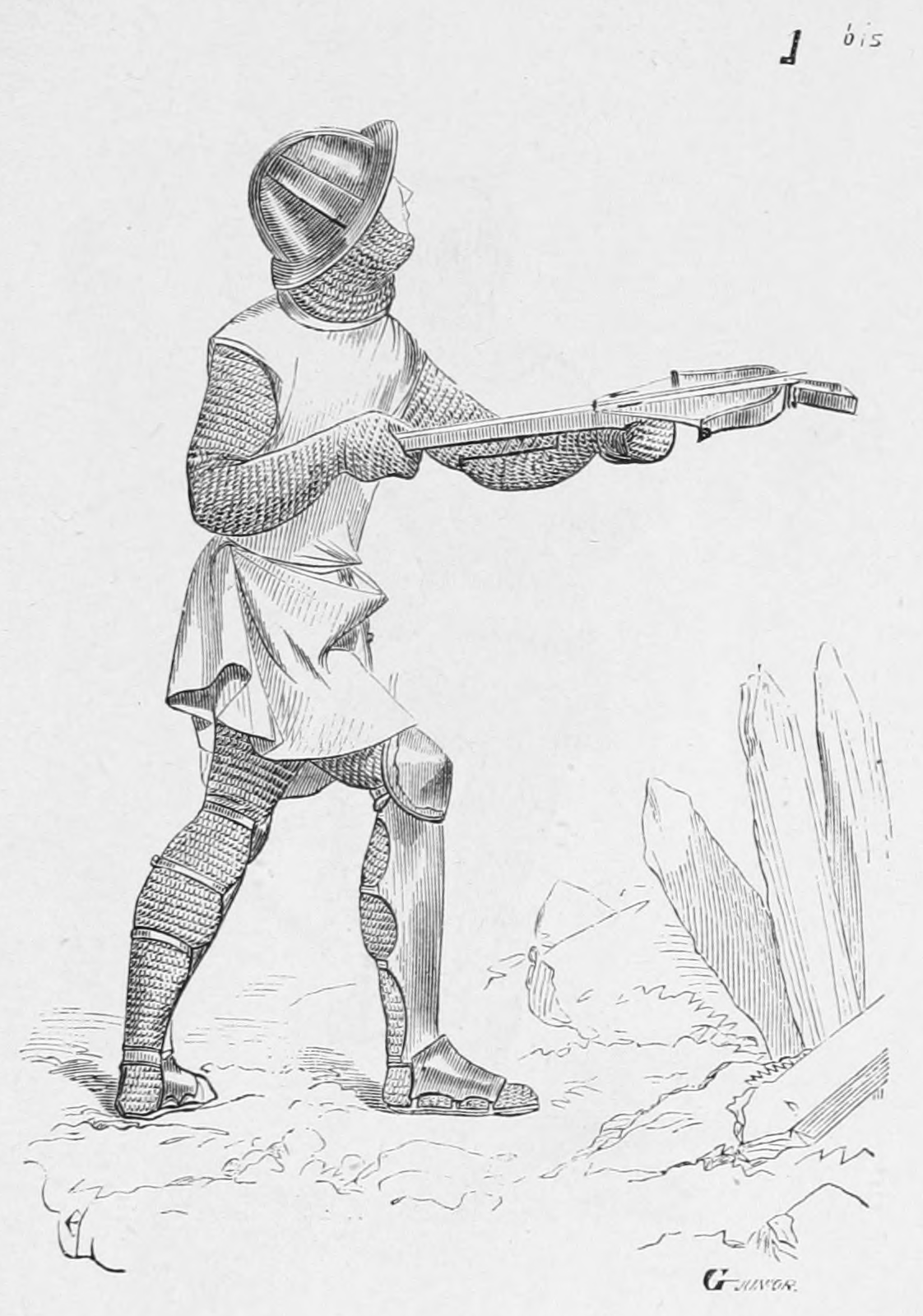
A 19th century depiction of a soldier using a crossbow.

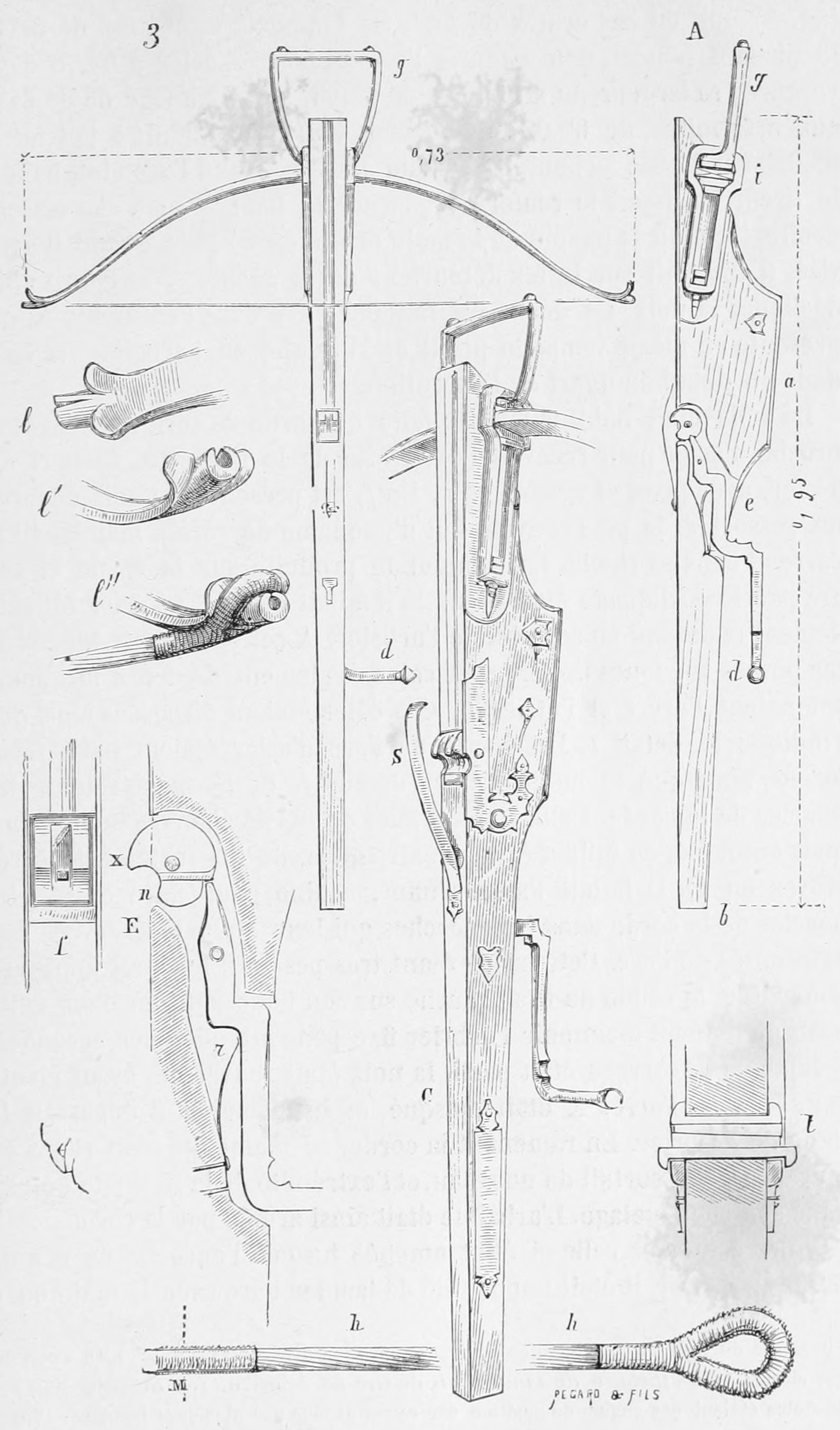
A thorough diagram of a crossbow. Notice the upwardly-curved bow, which was the change that most affected the bullet-shooting crossbow.

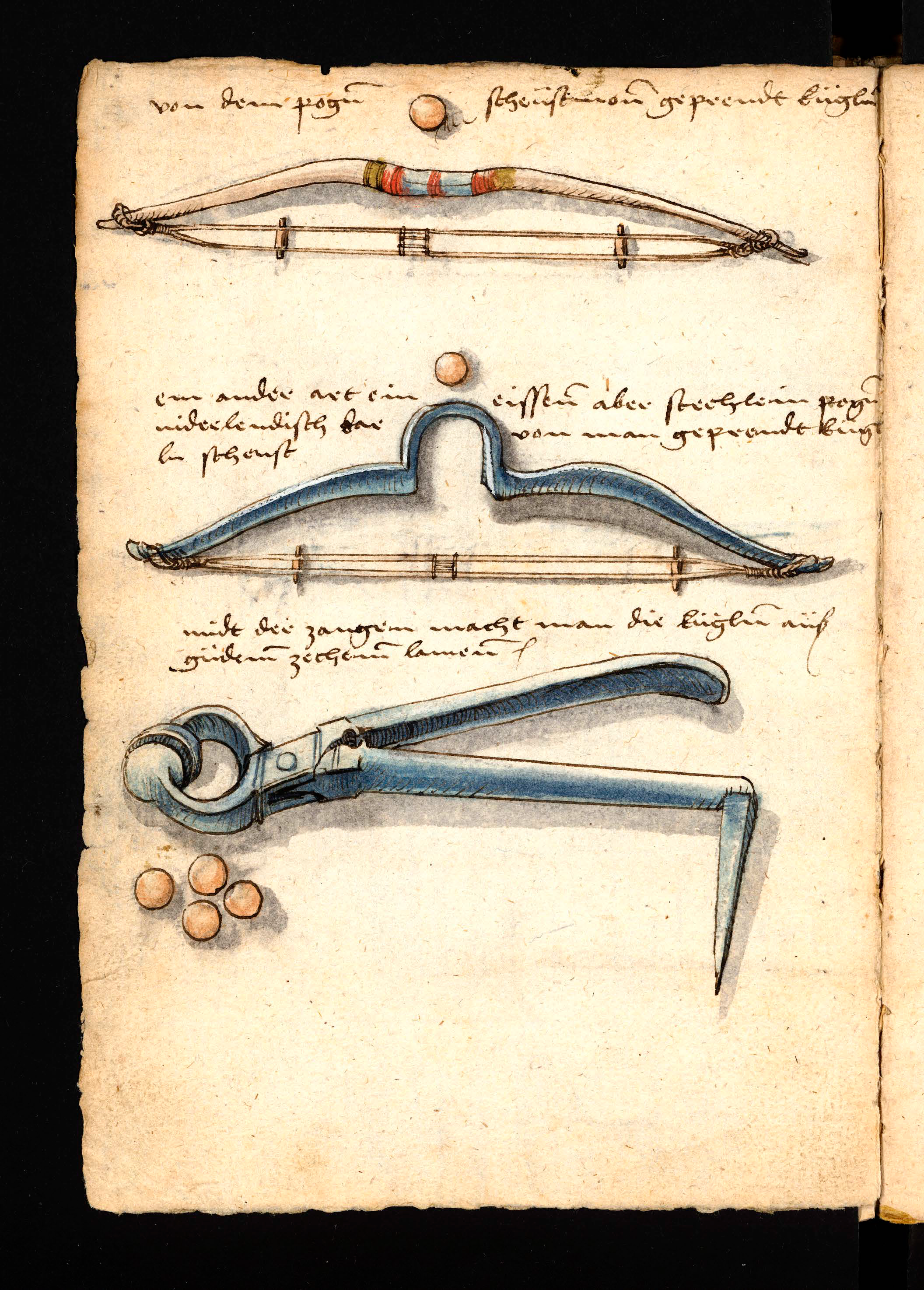
Two pellet bows from Codex Löffelholz, Nuremberg 1505

A bullet-shooting crossbow, also known as prodd, pelletbow, ballester, stone bow, or rock-throwing crossbow, is a modified version of the classic crossbow. The bow was usually constructed with wood or steel, depending on the preference. It typically utilizes bullets and stones as projectiles instead of the more traditional bolt or quarrel.

== History ==
The crossbow has been around since the 7th century BC. China was the first to create the hand-held crossbow. The ammunition of choice was the bolt and was often made of bronze. It was used effectively as a weapon both in battle and for hunting. As powerful a weapon as the crossbow was, it lacked the capability of hunting smaller animals like birds, squirrels, and rabbits. As a weapon, the bolt crossbow was much more popular and therefore more widely developed than the bullet-shooting crossbow. Consequently, the standard crossbow was more frequently updated with new ammunition, attachments, and other improvements, leaving the bullet-shooting crossbow in the past. However, in discussing astronomical topics such as solar and lunar eclipses, the Western-Han era Chinese mathematician and music theorist Jing Fang (78–37 BC) wrote that the moon, shaped like a ball, produced no light and was illuminated only by the sun, which he compared to the shape of a round crossbow bullet.

The earliest known bullet-shooting crossbow was invented in the 16th century. It was a simple, two-string crossbow that shot small projectiles. The earliest forms of ammunition included clay balls, which were rolled and baked to form round, hard bullets. The bow's primary purpose was to shoot birds, as conventional weapons lacked the ability to effectively hunt flying prey. The lighter projectiles from a pellet bow flew faster, so the shooter had a better chance of hitting a moving target.

One of the most important changes to the bullet-shooting crossbow was the strong, upwardly curved bow. This allowed the strings and pouch, which hold and launch the bullet, to be placed away from the rest of the gun. This allowed for a straighter stock or body of the crossbow, which utilizes stronger springs to launch bullets faster and more accurately.

Though it was used extensively for hunting, the bullet-shooting crossbow was not significantly improved until the late 18th century. The English changed the design to allow for a more powerful spring and larger ammunition. The bow was adapted to shoot half ounce lead bullets, which are more accurate and do much more damage than stones and clay pellets.

The bullet-shooting crossbow featured many similarities to the slingshot, a similar weapon. Both feature a pouch that holds a small projectile. In comparison tests, the bullet-shooting crossbow only shoots slightly faster, but much more accurately than the slingshot. A catapult is faster and can be quite accurate, but is not as powerful as the stronger pellet bows and elastic is a relatively modern invention.

With the invention of safe, more powerful, and more accurate rifles, the bullet-shooting crossbow became obsolete shortly after. By the time the 19th century came around, the bow appeared to be on its way out. Gunpowder is much more powerful and destructive than a crossbow, and guns quickly became the new weapon of choice both for hunting and war.

== Uses ==
Because most bullet-shooting crossbows use small bullets, the bullet-shooting crossbow was used primarily for hunting. The small caliber rounds are perfect for killing animals like birds and rats. Being a crossbow, it does not produce much sound. Even though more powerful weapons were invented, like the air gun, the bullet-shooting crossbow was used extensively throughout history because it was not loud enough to scare prey off.

== Flaws ==
Many intended to use the bullet-shooting crossbow as a weapon of war, but it had its limitations. While the bow worked well on small animals like squirrels and birds, it was not powerful enough to be a reliable weapon in war. The velocity was too low for the bullets or stone to pierce skin, and therefore it did not cause much damage to humans. The bullet-shooting crossbow had the potential to fracture skulls, but as this was the only effective way to take down the enemy, the bullet-shooting crossbow failed to match the standard crossbow, firing bolts or quarrels in wartime.

In addition to the low-velocity shots of the bullet-shooting crossbow, the projectiles were not as effective as the bolt on the standard crossbow. The sharp bolts of the crossbow did more damage than the slow-moving, blunt bullets of the bullet-shooting crossbow. Because the standard bolt does more damage, the bullet-shooting crossbow was reserved for hunting smaller animals. There was no reason to use a bolt-shooting crossbow to hunt squirrels when a smaller, less-powerful weapon could get the job done just as effectively.

Another flaw lies in the material of choice: steel. Steel bows require more energy to return the bow to its original position and therefore deliver less energy to the shot itself. Bows made of wood typically shot much faster than those made of steel.

== See also ==
- Repeating crossbow
- Slurbow
