= Harpoon =

Long spear-like instrument used in marine hunting

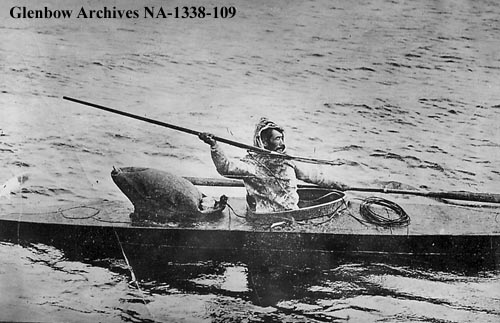
Inuk hunter with harpoon in Kayak, Hudson Bay, c. 1908–1914

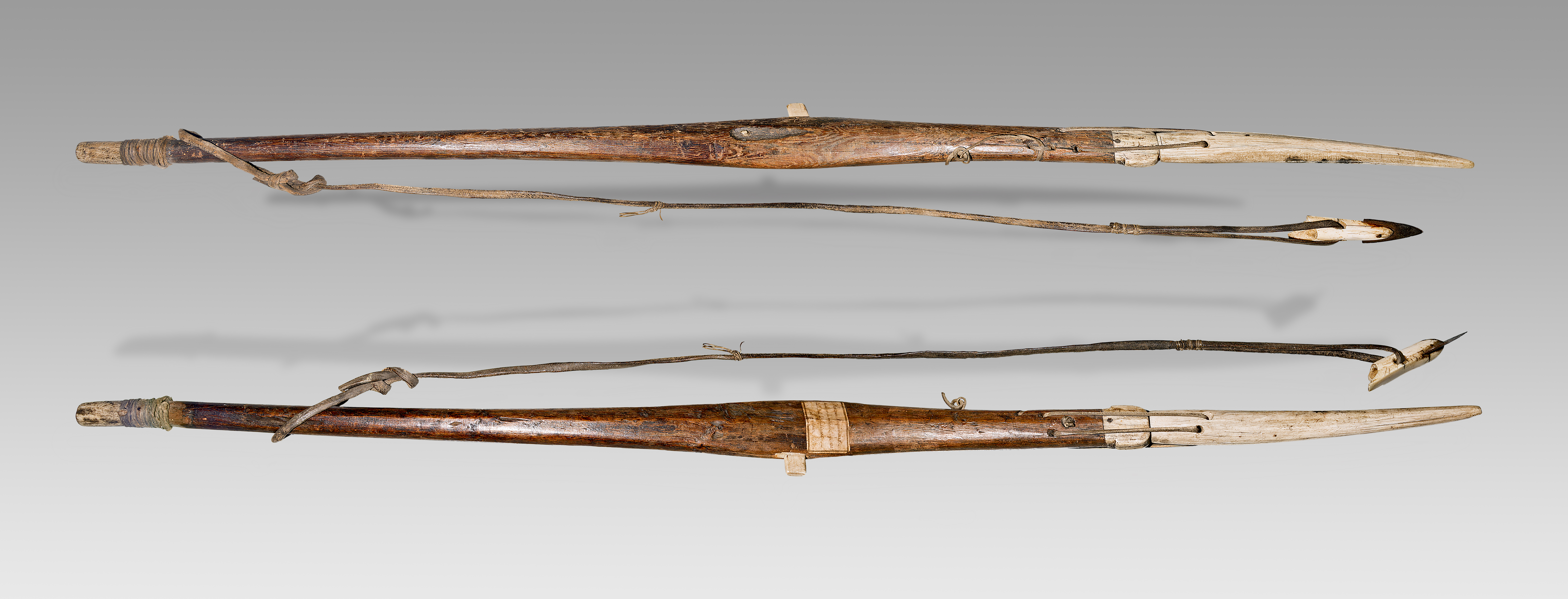
Unaaq ᐅᓈᖅ, a harpoon used by Inuit, 172 cm (68 in; 5.64 ft) long, MHNT

A harpoon is a long, spear-like projectile used in fishing, whaling, sealing, and other hunting to shoot, kill, and capture large fish such as sharks or marine mammals such as seals, sea cows, and whales. It impales the target and secures it with barb or toggling claws, allowing the fishermen or hunters to use an attached rope or chain to pull and retrieve the animal. A harpoon can also be used as a weapon against watercraft in naval warfare.

Certain harpoons are made with different builds to perform better with the type of target. For example, the Inuit have short, fixed-foreshaft harpoons for hunting at breathing holes, while loose-shafted ones are made for throwing and remaining attached to the game.

== History ==
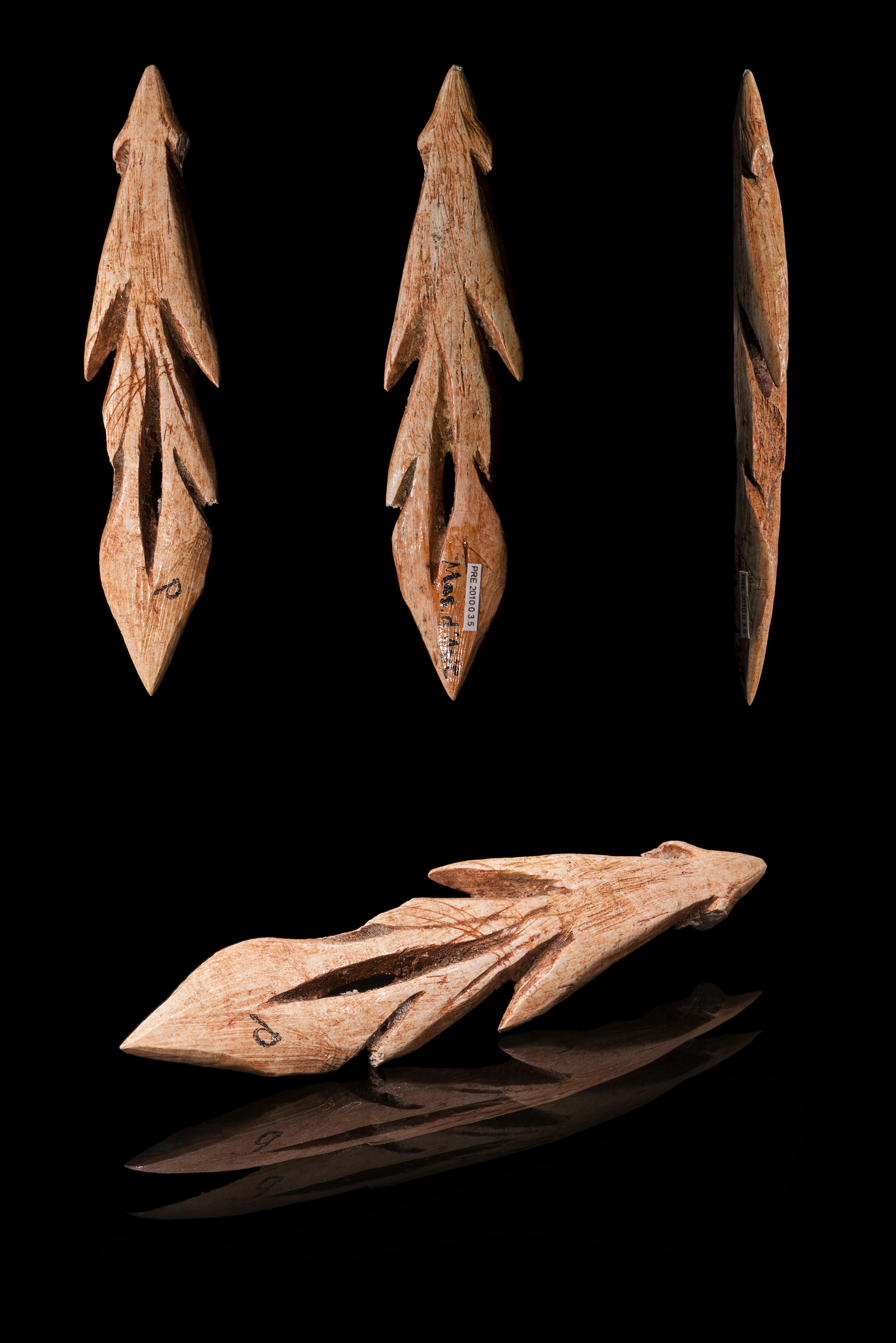
Epipaleolithic Azilian Le Mas-d'Azil, Ariège, France

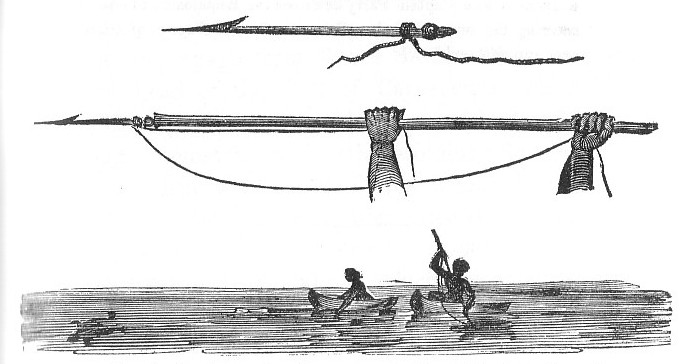
"Manner in which Natives of the East Coast strike turtle." Near Cooktown, Australia. From Phillip Parker King's Survey. 1818.

For thousands of years, Inuit and other indigenous people of the Arctic have used specialized harpoons to hunt sea mammals. Unlike a simple spear, its most critical feature is a detachable head designed to toggle or turn sideways inside the animal's flesh, which prevents the line from pulling out. Some walrus harpoons are sharp, long, and pointy, with rawhide wrapped around the wooden shaft, ivory for the sharp spear head for easier killing, and an attached ice pick.

In the 1990s, harpoon points, known as the Semliki harpoons or the Katanda harpoons, were found in the Katanda region in Zaire. As the earliest known harpoons, these weapons were made and used 90,000 years ago, most likely to spear catfishes. However, this is disputed as the dating techniques used are less accurate at that epoch. Later, in Japan, spearfishing with poles was widespread in palaeolithic times, especially during the Solutrean and Magdalenian periods. Cosquer Cave in southern France has cave art over 16,000 years old, including drawings of seals that appear to have been harpooned.

There are references to harpoons in ancient literature, though in most cases the descriptions do not go into detail. An early example can be found in the Bible in Job 41:7 (NIV): "Can you fill its hide with harpoons or its head with fishing spears?" The Greek historian Polybius (c. 203 BC – 120 BC), in his Histories, describes hunting for swordfish by using a harpoon with a barbed and detachable head. Copper harpoons were known to the seafaring Harappans well into antiquity. Early hunters in India include the Mincopie people, aboriginal inhabitants of India's Andaman and Nicobar islands, who have used harpoons with long cords for fishing since early times.

=== Whaling ===
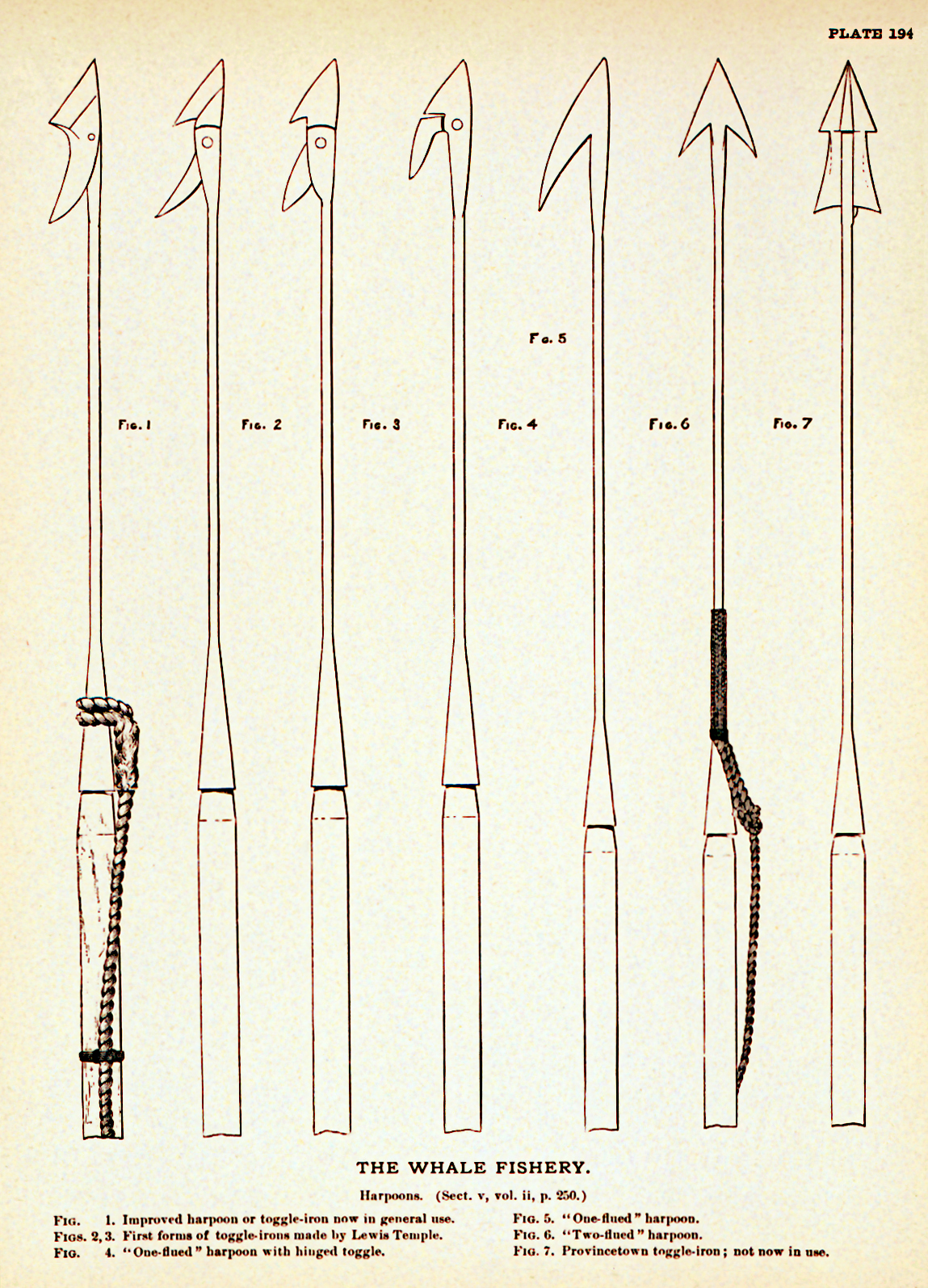
Harpoons used in the whale fishery, 1887, including new design from Provincetown whalemen

In the novel Moby-Dick, Herman Melville explained the reason for the harpoon's effectiveness:

In most land animals there are certain valves or flood gates in many of their veins, whereby when wounded, the blood is in some degree at least instantly shut off in certain directions. Not so with the whale; one of whose peculiarities is, to have an entire non-valvular structure of the blood-vessels, so that when pierced even by so small a point as a harpoon, a deadly drain is at once begun upon his whole arterial system; and when this is heightened by the extraordinary pressure of water at a great distance below the surface, his life may be said to pour from him in incessant streams. Yet so vast is the quantity of blood in him, and so distant and numerous its interior fountains, that he will keep thus bleeding and bleeding for a considerable period; even as in a drought a river will flow, whose source is in the well springs of far off and undiscernible hills.

— Herman Melville, Moby-Dick, 1851

He also describes another device that was at times a necessary addition to harpoons:

All whale-boats carry certain curious contrivances, originally invented by the Nantucket Indians, called druggs [i.e. drogues]. Two thick squares of wood of equal size are stoutly clenched together, so that they cross each other's grain at right angles; a line of considerable length is then attached to the middle of this block, and the other end of the line being looped, it can in a moment be fastened to a harpoon. It is chiefly among gallied [frightened] whales that this drugg is used. For then, more whales are close round you than you can possibly chase at one time. But sperm whales are not every day encountered; while you may, then, you must kill all you can. And if you cannot kill them all at once, you must wing [injure] them, so that they can be afterwards killed at your leisure. Hence it is that at times like these the drugg comes into requisition.

— Melville, Moby-Dick

=== Explosive harpoons ===
The first use of explosives in the hunting of whales was made by the British South Sea Company in 1737, after some years of declining catches. A large fleet was sent, armed with cannon-fired harpoons. Although the weaponry was successful in killing the whales, most of the catch sank before being retrieved. However, the system was still occasionally used, and underwent successive improvements at the hands of various inventors over the next century, including Abraham Stagholt in the 1770s and George Manby in the early 19th century.

William Congreve, who invented some of the first rockets for British Army use, designed a rocket-propelled whaling harpoon in the 1820s. The shell was designed to explode on contact and impale the whale with the harpoon. The weapon was in turn attached by a line to the boat, and the hope was that the explosion would generate enough gas within the whale to keep it afloat for retrieval. Expeditions were sent out to try this new technology; many whales were killed, but most of them sank. These early devices, called bomb lances, became widely used for the hunting of humpbacks and right whales. A notable user of these early explosive harpoons was the American Thomas Welcome Roys in 1865, who set up a shore station in Seydisfjördur, Iceland. A slump in oil prices after the American Civil War forced their endeavor into bankruptcy in 1867.

An early version of the explosive harpoon was designed by Jacob Nicolai Walsøe, a Norwegian painter and inventor. His 1851 application was rejected by the interior ministry on the grounds that he had received public funding for his experiments. In 1867, a Danish fireworks manufacturer, Gaetano Amici, patented a cannon-fired harpoon, and in the same year, an Englishman, George Welch, patented a grenade harpoon very similar to the version which transformed whaling in the following decade.

In 1870, the Norwegian shipping magnate Svend Foyn patented and pioneered the modern exploding whaling harpoon and gun. Foyn had studied the American method in Iceland. His basic design is still in use today. He perceived the failings of other methods and solved these problems in his own system. He included, with the help of H.M.T. Esmark, a grenade tip that exploded inside the whale. This harpoon design also utilized a shaft that was connected to the head with a moveable joint. His original cannons were muzzle-loaded with special padding and also used a unique form of gunpowder. The cannons were later replaced with safer breech-loading types.

Together with the steam engine, this development ushered in the modern age of commercial whaling. Euro-American whalers were now equipped to hunt faster and more powerful species, such as the rorquals. Because rorquals sank when they died, later versions of the exploding harpoon injected air into the carcass to keep it afloat.

The modern whaling harpoon consists of a deck-mounted launcher (mostly a cannon) and a projectile which is a large harpoon with an explosive (penthrite) charge, attached to a thick rope. The spearhead is shaped in a manner which allows it to penetrate the thick layers of whale blubber and stick in the flesh. It has sharp spikes to prevent the harpoon from sliding out. Thus, by pulling the rope with a motor, the whalers can drag the whale back to their ship.

A recent development in harpoon technology is the hand-held speargun. Divers use the speargun for spearing fish. They may also be used for defense against dangerous marine animals. Spearguns may be powered by pressurized gas or with mechanical means like springs or elastic bands.

Bomb lance whaling harpoon, pictured in 1878, prominent in the famous whaling legal case Ghen v. Rich

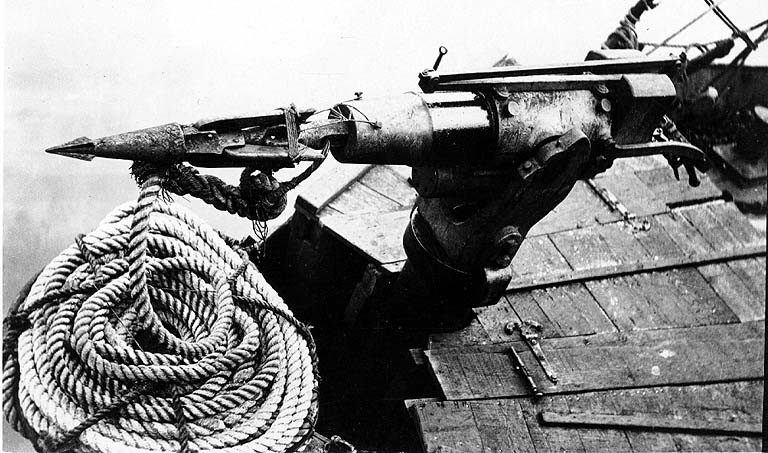
Harpoon mounted on a whaling boat in Alaska, c. 1915

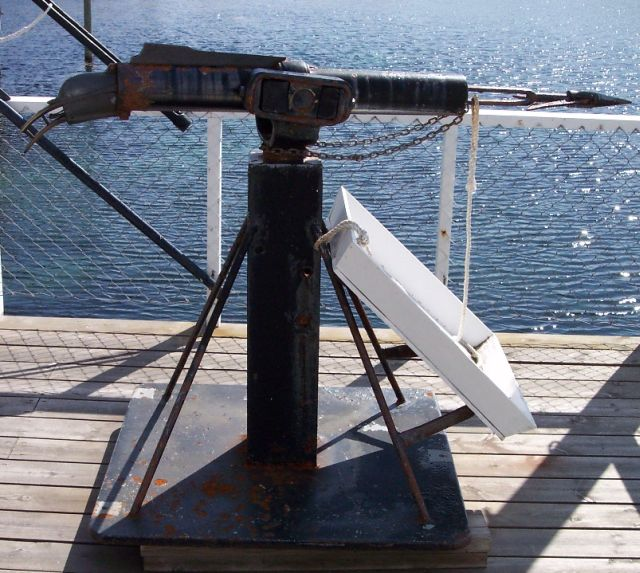
Modern whaling harpoon

== Space ==
The Philae spacecraft carried harpoons for helping the probe anchor itself to the surface of comet 67P/Churyumov–Gerasimenko. However, the harpoons failed to fire.

== See also ==
- Hawaiian sling
- Kakivak
- Leister
- Speargun
- Trident
