= Kakivak =

Long weapon used in spear fishing

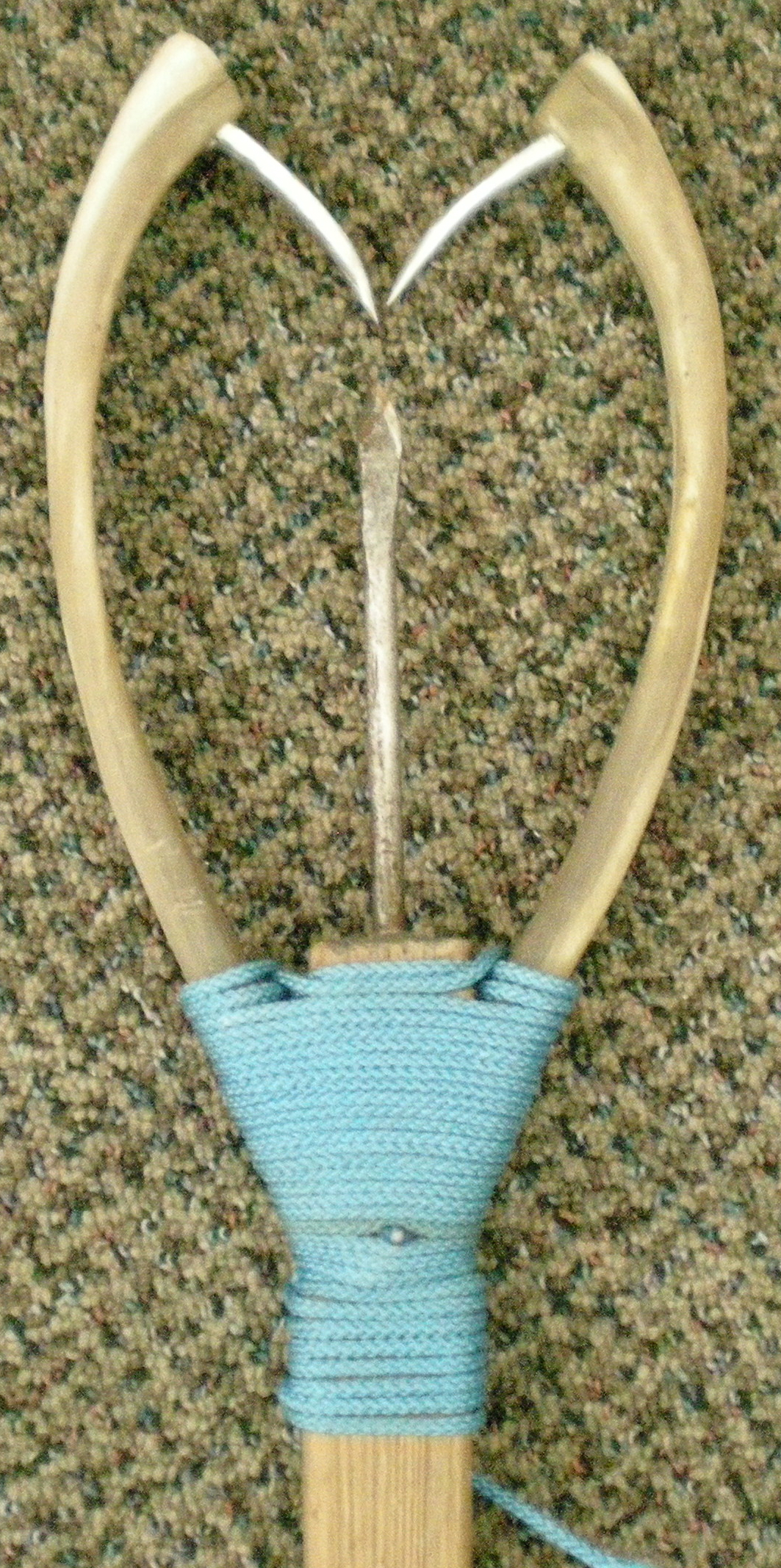
An Inuit Kakivak tip

A kakivak is a leister used by Inuit for spear fishing and fishing at short range. It is comparable to a harpoon or a trident in function and shape. The kakivak is notable for its tip's design, which has three prongs, the outer which have their own teeth which point at the centre prong. The teeth are to hold the meat on to the main blade to stop it from falling.

Usage of the kakivak was apparently not restricted to Inuit, as copies were also utilized by Norse settlers.

== Construction ==
The kakivak is made of ivory, bone, or antler for the spear, and driftwood, sticks, or rock for the handle.

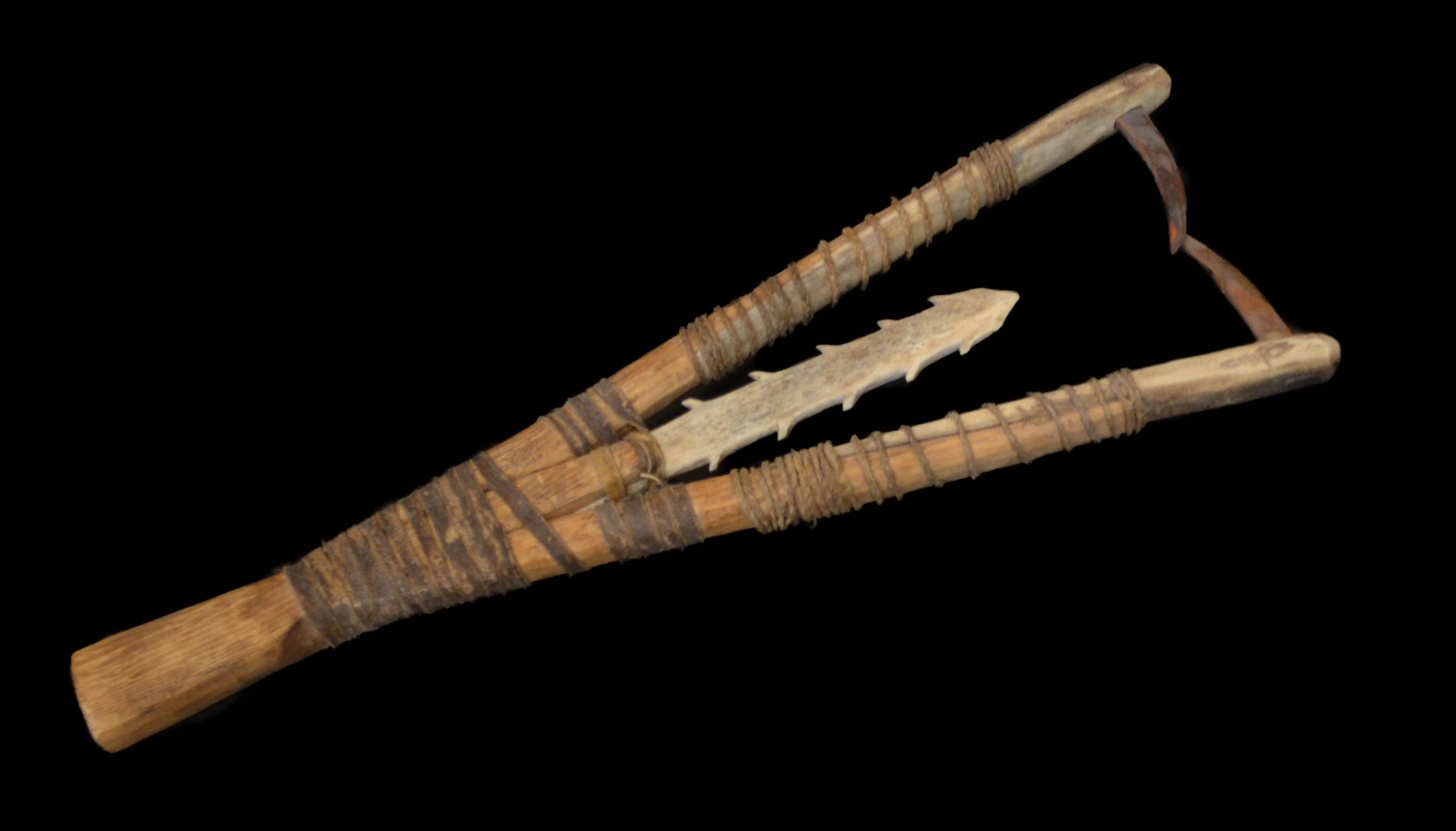
A tip of a Kakivak from the Inuinnait culture
