= Slurbow =

Type of crossbow

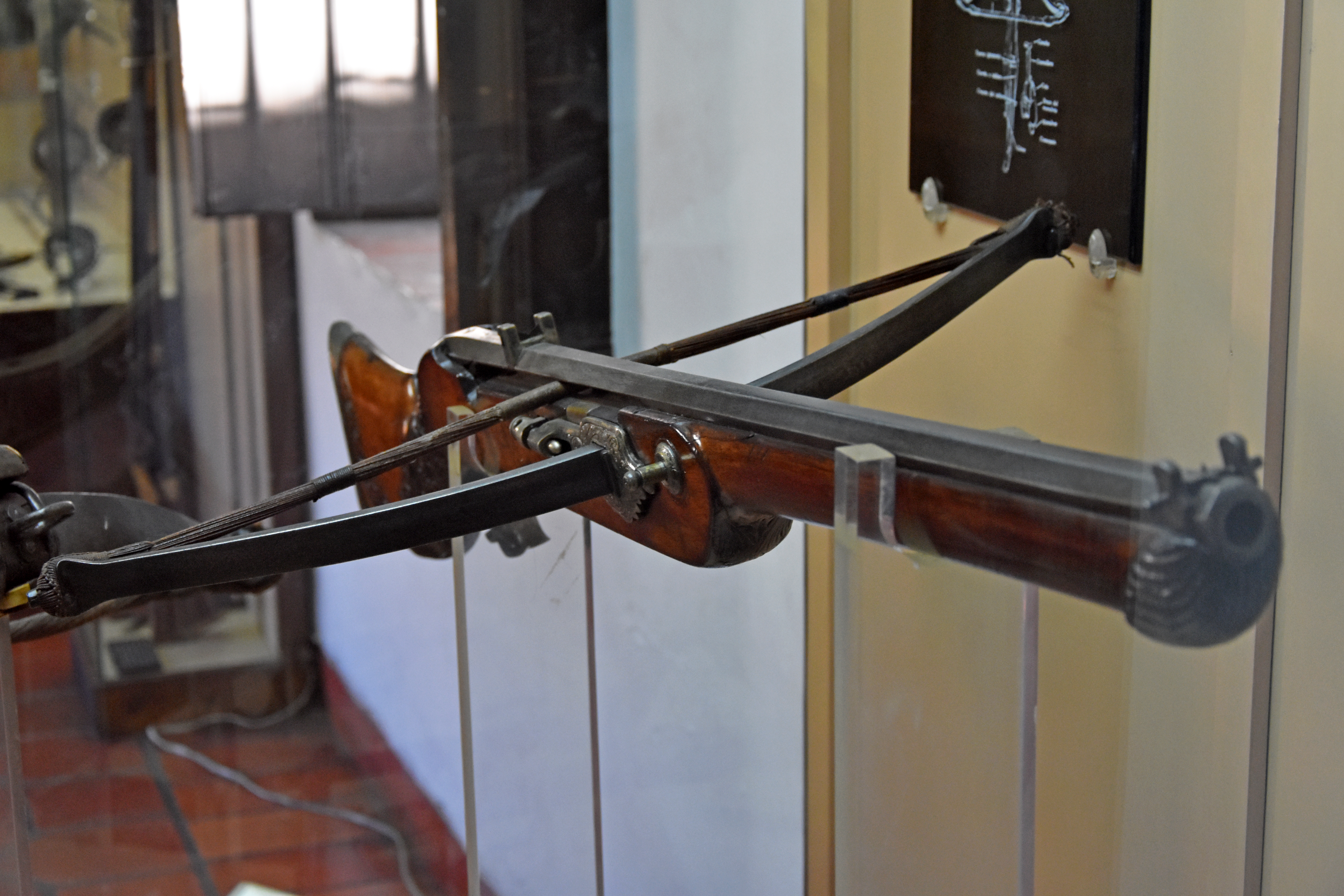
Slurbow on display at the Museo de las Casas Reales

The slurbow / barreled crossbow is a type of crossbow with a wood or metal barrel over the top of the stock that is arguably influenced by the emergence of the pistol. There is a gap between that shroud and the stock allowing the string to travel unimpeded. Few examples of the medieval slurbow that remain to this day; one of the few is one dated 1549 in the Royal Armoury of Madrid.

The slurbow was not mentioned in medieval writing until the first quarter of the sixteenth century. References from the time, including 'Slurbows and their arrows', 'Slurbow bolts', and 'fire arrows for slurbows', appear in many ledgers for weapon stores in castles. The records make clear that slurbows fired bolts and arrows like the crossbows they were based on. Most of the bolts designed for the slurbow had no feathers on the shaft that would have impeded the travel of the arrow down the makeshift barrel, whereas a standard crossbow provides a horizontal platform on which the bolt rests.

== Gallery ==
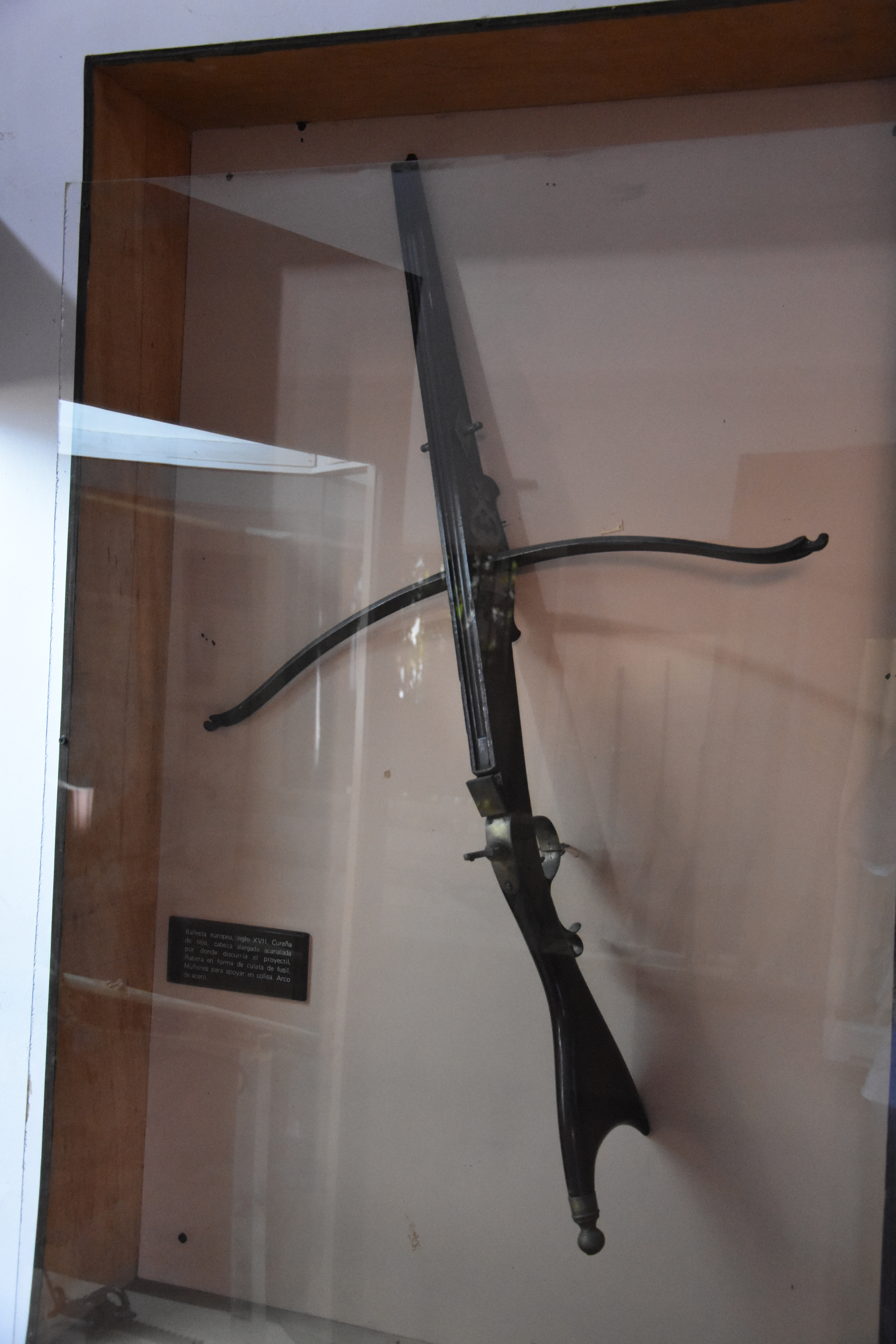

== See also ==
- Bullet-shooting crossbow
- Repeating crossbow
