= Polespear =

Basic rubber launched underwater fishing spear

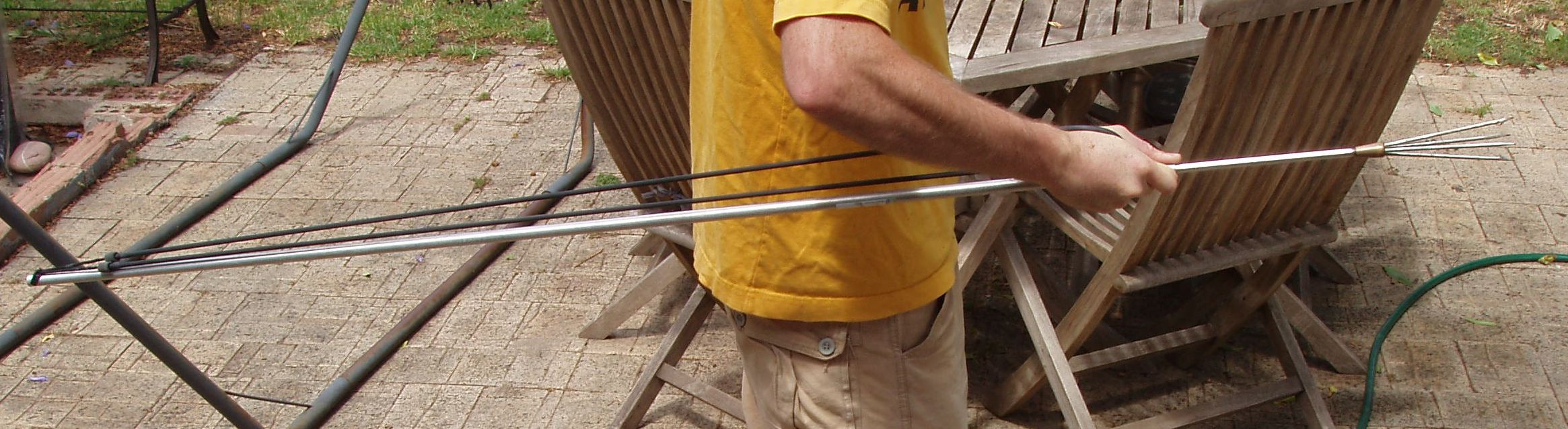
Polespear under tension with a cluster head attached.

A polespear (hand spear or gidgee) is an underwater tool used in spearfishing, consisting of a pole, a spear tip, and a rubber loop. Polespears are often mistakenly called Hawaiian slings, but the tools differ. A Hawaiian sling is akin to a slingshot or an underwater bow and arrow, since the spear and the propelling device are separate, while a polespear has the sling (rubber loop) attached to the spear.

== Description ==
The pole is usually between four feet and ten feet long and made of fiberglass, carbon fibre, aluminum, graphite, or wood. Longer versions often break down into two or more pieces that screw together. The tip is either threaded to accept different kinds of spear tips or already has a fixed tip attached. The most popular spear tip on polespears are the paralyzer (often called a three-prong), and the Tahitian shaft (a single pivoting barb). Some more serious hunters will equip the polespear with a slip-tip (tip removes from the end and tethers to a fixed point). At the butt end of the spear is an elastic loop, usually made of surgical tubing or a band of rubber (a bicycle inner tube, for example).

The spear is operated by placing the rubber loop in the crook of the thumb, then reaching up the spear shaft to stretch the elastic band and grabbing the polespear to hold the band in tension. On flimsy spears, it's useful to twist the spear as the band stretches to keep the spear from bending. Shooting the spear involves releasing the grasp of the hand but still using the hand to guide the spear like a barrel to a gun. The firing distance of a polespear can be divided into two ranges. First, there is the overall distance of the stretch or the 'travel range'. This second range is the distance that most are interested in as it is more relevant to penetrating fish. For this reason, it is called the 'penetrating range.' Not all the travel of the spear being fired has the 'punch' to penetrate through fish. Depending on the polespear's attributes such as mass, drag, band strength, band stretch, etc., the penetrating range can be from a scant few inches to several feet. Other factors may include fish orientation, fish width, density, skin composition, etc. One would need to take all the attributes into account before firing a polespear towards a target. For example, the band pull on a 10 ft (300 cm) polespear may stretch up to 6 ft (180 cm) of the polespear. It actually requires about 8 ft (240 cm) of polespear, measured from the rear, to do this because the stretch doesn't start till the band begins to provide tension (typically, about 2 ft (61 cm) loop length on a 10 ft (300 cm)) footer. However, the penetrating range may only be half of the pull. This equals about 3 ft (91 cm) for a 10 ft (300 cm) footer. Some fish, however, are thicker/denser and may require much closer shots.

The more mass a polespear contains, the more band power it will require to move the same speed as a polespear with less mass. However, some fiberglass or extremely lightweight polespears will have so little mass that there is little velocity or 'punch' behind them when it hits a fish.

A hybrid polespear combines aluminum with a more flexible material such as a fiberglass rod. These polespears offer rigidity for loading, but still some flexibility in the front end to absorb the lateral movements of a fish once it is attached to the end.
