= Leister =

Type of spear used for spearfishing

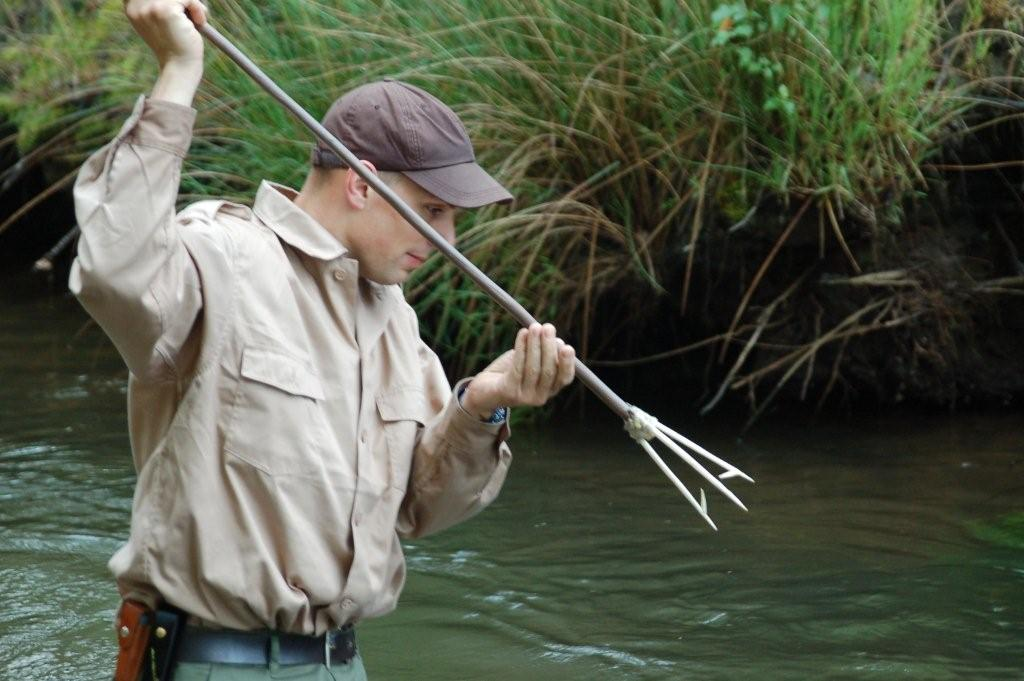
A leister used for spearfishing

A leister is a type of spear used for spearfishing.

Leisters are three-pronged with backward-facing barbs, historically often built using materials such as bone and ivory, with tools such as the saw-knife. In many cases it could be disassembled into a harpoon allowing for greater functionality.

Leisters have been used by hunter-gatherer cultures throughout the world since the Stone Age and are still used for fishing by indigenous tribes and cultures today.

== See also ==
- Kakivak
- Trident
