= Repeating crossbow =

Type of weapon invented in China

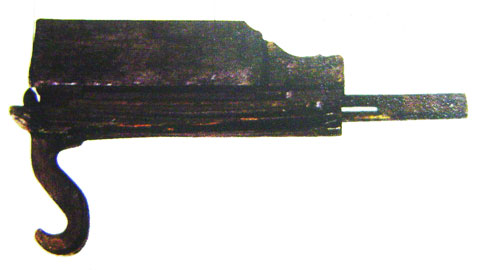
- The earliest extant repeating crossbow, a double-shot repeating crossbow excavated from a tomb of the State of Chu, 4th century BC
- Traditional Chinese: 諸葛弩
- Simplified Chinese: 诸葛弩
- Literal meaning: "Zhuge [Liang] crossbow"
Transcriptions
Standard Mandarin
- Hanyu Pinyin: Zhūgě nǔ
- Wade–Giles: Chu^{1}-ko^{2} nu^{3}
- IPA: [ʈʂúkɤ̌ nù]
Yue: Cantonese
- Yale Romanization: Jyū-got nóuh
- Jyutping: Zyu^{1}-got^{3} nou^{5}
Southern Min
- Hokkien POJ: Chu-kat ló͘
- Tâi-lô: Tsu-kat lóo

The repeating crossbow (Chinese: 連弩; pinyin: Lián Nǔ), also known as the repeater crossbow, and the Zhuge crossbow (Chinese: 諸葛弩; pinyin: Zhūgě nǔ, also romanized Chu-ko-nu) due to its association with the Three Kingdoms-era strategist Zhuge Liang (181–234 AD), is a crossbow invented during the Warring States period in China that combined the bow spanning, bolt placing, and shooting actions into one motion.

The earliest archaeological evidence of the repeating crossbow is found in the state of Chu, but it uses a pistol grip that is different from the later and more commonly known Ming dynasty design.

Although the repeating crossbow was in use throughout most of Chinese history until the late Qing dynasty, it was generally regarded as a non-military weapon suited for women, defending households against robbers when used as a handheld weapon. The military typically uses larger, heavier, stationary designs as siege and naval weaponry.

== History ==
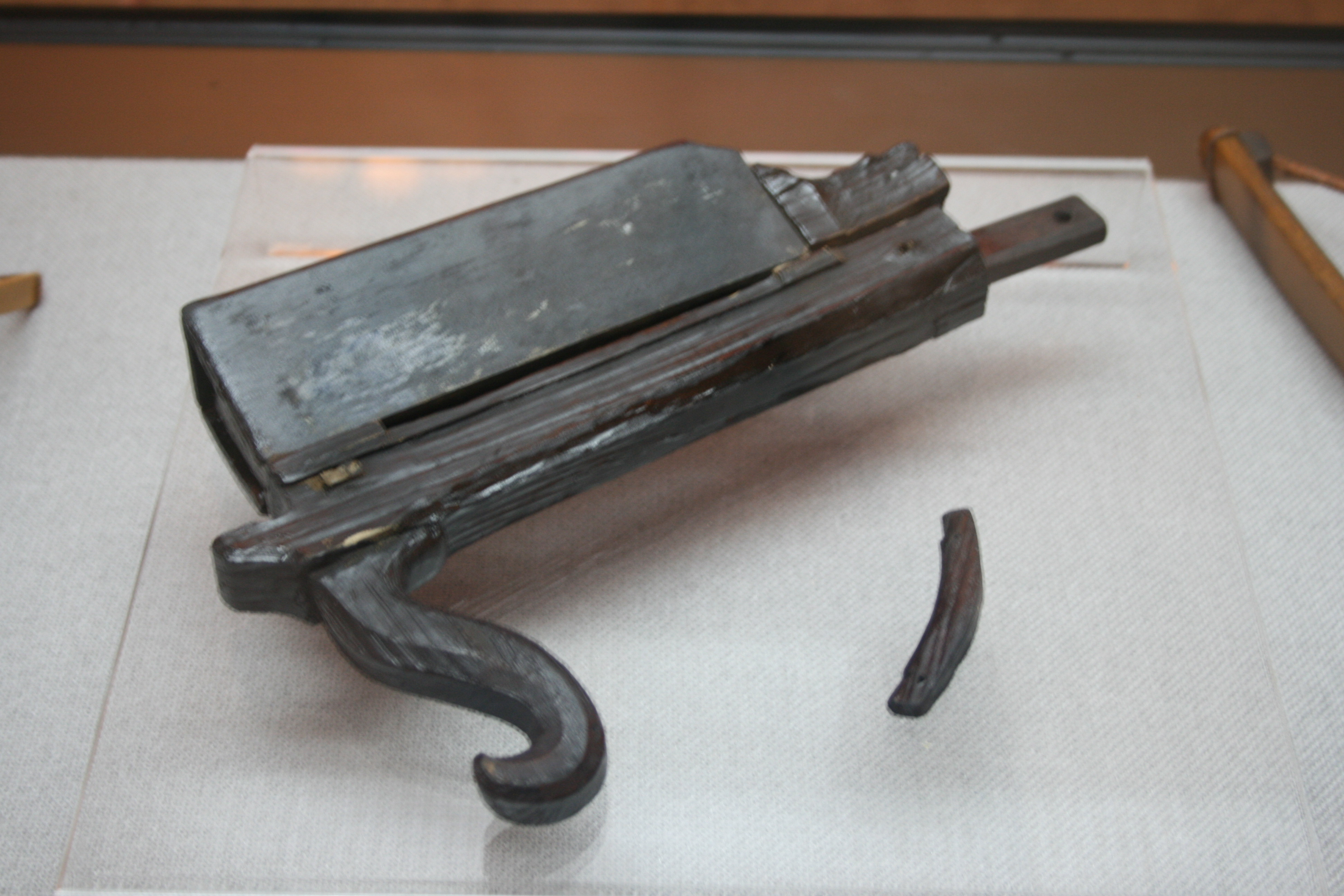
Repeating crossbow, Chu-state period

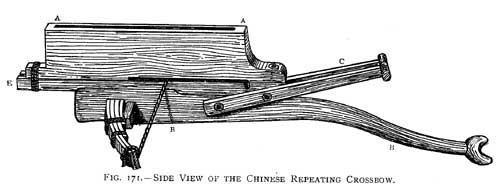
A non-recurve repeating crossbow. Ones used for war would be recurved

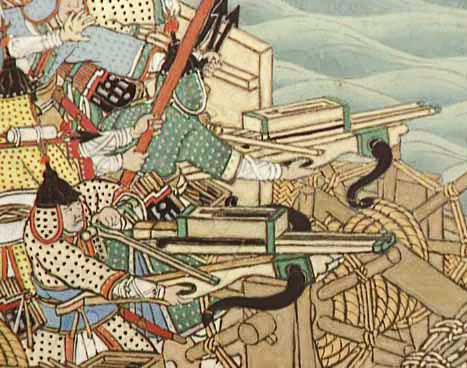
Naval battle scroll(朝鮮戦役海戦図屏風/太田天洋) depicting joseon soldiers utilizing repeating recurve crossbows during the Imjin War

The Zhuge Nu is a handy little weapon that even the Confucian scholar or palace women can use in self-defence... It fires weakly so you have to tip the darts with poison. Once the darts are tipped with "tiger-killing poison", you can shoot it at a horse or a man and as long as you draw blood, your adversary will die immediately. The draw-back to the weapon is its very limited range.

— Complete Classics Collection of Ancient China

According to the Wu-Yue Chunqiu (history of the Wu-Yue War), written in the Eastern Han dynasty, the repeating crossbow was invented during the Warring States Period by a Mr. Qin from the State of Chu. This is corroborated by the earliest archaeological evidence of repeating crossbows, which was excavated from a Chu burial site at Tomb 47 at Qinjiazui, Hubei Province, and has been dated to the 4th century BC, during the Warring States Period (475 - 220 BC). Unlike repeating crossbows of later eras, the ancient double-shot repeating crossbow uses a pistol grip and a rear-pulling mechanism for arming. The Ming repeating crossbow uses an arming mechanism that requires its user to push a rear lever upwards and downwards back and forth. Although handheld repeating crossbows were generally weak and required additional poison, probably aconite, for lethality, much larger mounted versions appeared during the Ming dynasty.

In 180 AD, Yang Xuan used a type of repeating crossbow powered by the movement of wheels:

...around A.D. 180 when Yang Xuan, Grand Protector of Lingling, attempted to suppress heavy rebel activity with badly inadequate forces. Yang's solution was to load several tens of wagons with sacks of lime and mount automatic crossbows on others. Then, deploying them into a fighting formation, he exploited the wind to engulf the enemy with clouds of lime dust, blinding them, before setting rags on the tails of the horses pulling these driverless artillery wagons alight. Directed into the enemy's heavily obscured formation, their repeating crossbows (powered by linkage with the wheels) fired repeatedly in random directions, inflicting heavy casualties. Amidst the obviously great confusion the rebels fired back furiously in self-defense, decimating each other before Yang's forces came up and largely exterminated them.

— Ralph Sawyer

The invention of the repeating crossbow has often been attributed to Zhuge Liang, but he in fact had nothing to do with it. This misconception is based on a record attributing improvements to the multiple bolt crossbows to him.

During the Ming dynasty, repeating crossbows were used on ships.

Although the repeating crossbow has been used throughout Chinese history and is attested as late as 19th century Qing dynasty in battle against the Japanese, it was generally not regarded as an important military weapon. The Wubei Zhi, written during the 17th century, says that it was favored by people in southeast China but lacked in strength and its bolts tended not to harm anyone. The functions of the repeating crossbow listed in the text are primarily non-military: tiger hunting, defending fortified houses, and usage by timid men and women. According to the Tiangong Kaiwu, also written during the 17th century, the repeating crossbow is only useful against robbers.

== Designs ==
Ming dynasty repeating crossbow

The repeating crossbow combined the actions of spanning the bow, placing the bolt, and shooting into a one-handed movement, thus allowing for a much higher rate of fire than a standard hand-held crossbow. The most common repeating crossbow design originated from the Ming Dynasty and consisted of a top-mounted magazine containing a reservoir of bolts which fed the crossbow using gravity, a rectangular lever attached to both the tiller and the magazine, and a tiller mounting the prods with a stock. By holding the tiller firmly against the hip while pushing and pulling the lever forwards and backwards, the user was able to catch the drawstring on to side notches at the back of the magazine while loading the bolt. A sliding lug nut at the back of the magazine pushed the drawstring out of the notches once the lever is fully pulled backwards; with the tiller pushing the nut up and enabling the drawstring to propel the loaded bolt. The Korean version mounted the magazine at the end of a longer stalk as well as a pivoting recurve bow as a prod; increasing the draw strength, span, range, and performance of the crossbow. Additionally, both the Ming Dynasty in China and the Joseon Dynasty in Korea developed variations that either shot two to three bolts per draw or fired pellets in place of bolts.

An earlier version originated from the State of Chu during the Warring States period used a different design. It consisted of a tiller mounting a fixed double magazine on top as well as a pistol style grip at the bottom beneath the prods mount. Instead of an overhand lever for arming and shooting, it used a sliding lever that had a handle tied to the end with a chord. The lever was pumped forwards and backwards with one hand while the user held the pistol grip firm with the other hand; in a manner similar to drawing a regular bow. Within the crossbow, the lever was embedded with a special metal trigger composed of a latch and sear; the entire trigger being shaped like a crab's claw arm. Upon pushing the lever forward, the trigger was moved forward to catch the drawstring and becomes locked firm by friction and tensional forces from grooves inside the mounting lever and sear. Upon being drawn back, the draw string is spanned while the double magazine fed two bolts onto the firing slots on either side of the trigger once the drawstring is almost fully drawn. At the very end of the pulling action, the sear comes in contact with a round bar that holds the sliding lever in place. The bar pushed the sear forward to release the trigger and enable the drawstring to propel the two loaded bolts. Ultimately, it was superseded by the aforementioned design from the Ming Dynasty due to being overly complex with weaker performance.

== Utility ==
Fired from the hip, the bolts were fired in sequence from pumping the cocking lever forward and backward, arming and releasing in a continuous cyclic process until the magazine was emptied. This rocking action did not allow for precise firing, nor the ability to sight along the barrel as in a crossbow or a modern gun.

— Liang Jieming

The basic construction of the repeating crossbow has remained very much unchanged since its invention, making it one of the longest-lived mechanical weapons. The bolts of one magazine are fired and reloaded by simply pushing and pulling the lever back and forth.

The repeating crossbow had an effective range of 70 m (230 ft) and a maximum range of 180 m (590 ft). Its comparatively short range limited its usage to primarily defensive positions, where its ability to rapidly fire up to 7–10 bolts in 15–20 seconds was used to prevent assaults on gates and doorways. In comparison, a standard crossbow could only fire about two bolts a minute. The repeating crossbow, with its smaller and lighter ammunition, had neither the power nor the accuracy of a standard crossbow. Thus, it was not very useful against more heavily armoured troops unless poison was smeared on bolts, in which case even a small wound might prove fatal.

== See also ==
- Cheiroballistra
- Polybolos
- Rapid fire crossbow
- Panjagan
- Slurbow
