= Hawaiian sling =

Simple form of underwater speargun

The Hawaiian sling is a device used in spearfishing. The sling operates much like a bow and arrow does on land, but energy is stored in rubber tubing rather than a wooden or fiberglass bow.

== Description ==
Mechanically, the device is simple: the only moving parts are the spear shaft and the rubber tubing. A loop of tubing is attached to a block of material, often wood, with a hole drilled in it which is slightly larger in diameter than the shaft. The shaft is placed in the hole, notched in the loop and pulled back, tensioning the tubing. When the shaft is released, the tubing propels it forward, faster and further than a diver could by hand.

The Hawaiian sling has some similarities to spearguns and polespears, in that all are powered by energy stored in rubber tubing. However, it occupies a middle ground between the two; the sling is somewhat more powerful than a polespear and offers a much more comfortable grip, but is less powerful than most spear guns. Like a pole spear, the diver must exert force on the shaft to keep it from releasing, whereas a spear gun has a trigger mechanism to accomplish this.

The modern Hawaiian sling was popularised in the mid 1950s; however, fishing slings (without tubes or rubber-bands and with stones, instead spears) are mentioned in anthropological journals as early as 1917.

In some parts of the world, in order to limit the catch, the Hawaiian sling is the only type of spearfishing gear permissible. Hawaiian slings are especially popular among divers who want a more challenging hunt, or those operating in areas where triggered spearguns are banned, such as the Bahamas, Okinawa, Japan and the Netherlands.
